= French cruiser Lapérouse =

French naval vessel (1877–1898)

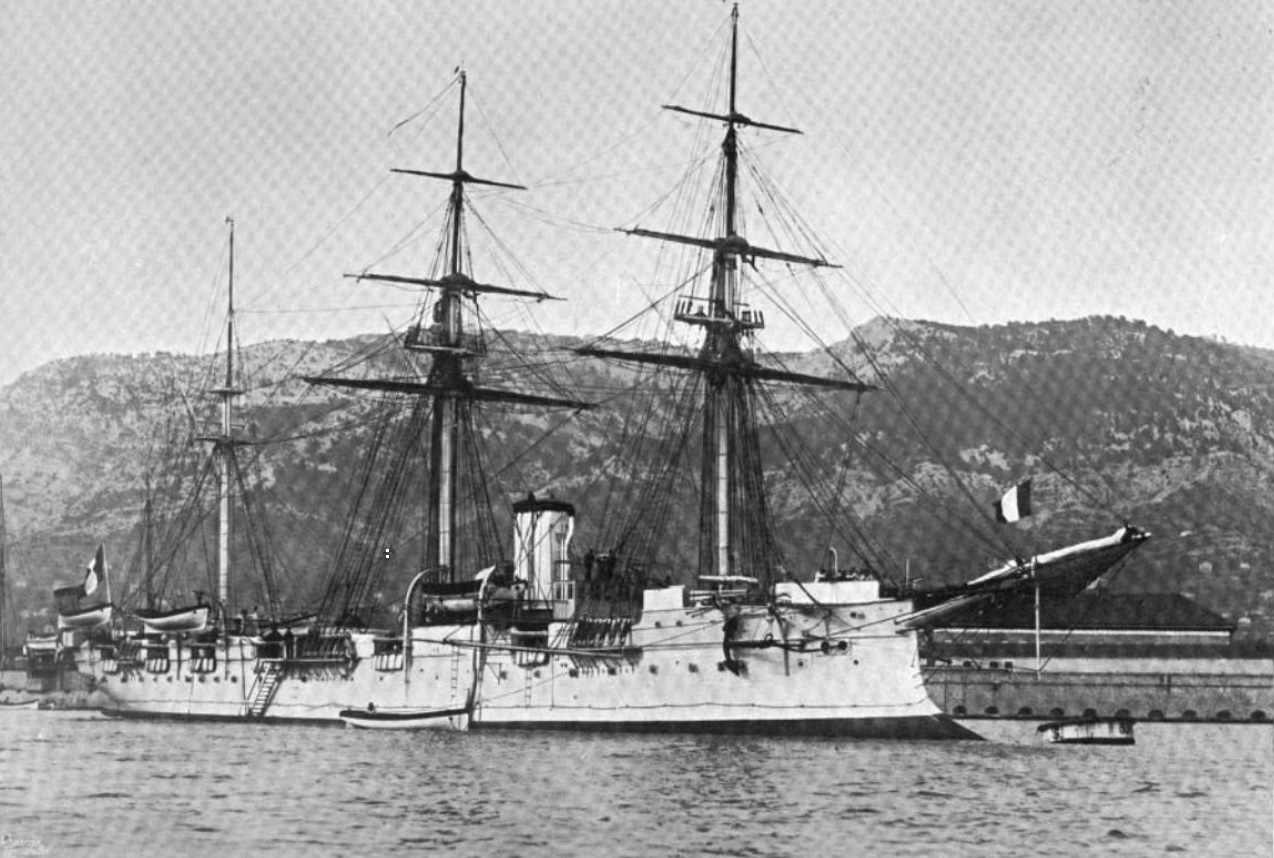
- Lapérouse in port, date unknown

History

France
- Name: Lapérouse
- Namesake: Jean-François de Galaup, comte de Lapérouse
- Builder: Arsenal de Brest
- Laid down: 23 June 1875
- Launched: 5 November 1877
- Commissioned: 6 October 1879
- Fate: Wrecked, 31 July 1898

General characteristics
- Class & type: Lapérouse-class cruiser
- Displacement: 2,320 t (2,280 long tons)
- Length: 79.5 m (260 ft 10 in) lwl
- Beam: 11.4 m (37 ft 5 in)
- Draft: 5.3 m (17 ft 5 in)
- Installed power: 6 × fire-tube boilers; 2,160 ihp (1,610 kW)
- Propulsion: 1 × compound steam engine; 1 × screw propeller
- Sail plan: Full ship rig
- Speed: 15 knots (28 km/h; 17 mph)
- Range: 4,980 nmi (9,220 km; 5,730 mi) at 10 knots (19 km/h; 12 mph)
- Complement: 264
- Armament: 15 × 138.6 mm (5.46 in) guns; 2 × 37 mm (1.5 in) Hotchkiss revolver cannon

Lapérouse was an unprotected cruiser, the lead ship of her class, built for the French Navy in the 1870s. The ship was intended to serve abroad in the French colonial empire, and was ordered to strengthen the fleet after the French defeat in the Franco-Prussian War. To allow the ship to cruise for long distances, she was fitted with a full ship rig to supplement her steam engine, and she carried a main battery of fifteen 138.6 mm (5.46 in) guns. Her top speed under steam was 15 knots (28 km/h; 17 mph).

Lapérouse was sent to East Asia in late 1884, arriving there in January 1885 during the Sino-French War. She participated in the blockade of Formosa and operations off the Yangtze river on mainland China. She remained in the Far East Squadron after the war ended later that year, but in 1886 she was moved to the Indian Ocean. In the early 1890s, she took part in training exercises with the main fleet in French waters. She was sent abroad again in 1896, returning to the Indian Ocean division, where she served as the division flagship. While in Madagascar in 1898, Lapérouse was driven ashore by a storm after her anchor chains were severed by a submerged wreck. Deemed a total loss, she was sold for scrap in 1901.

== Design ==
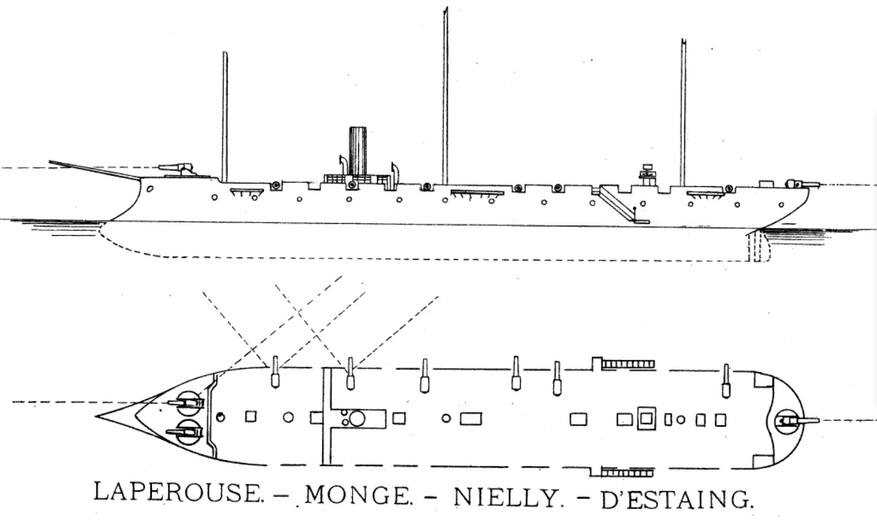
Plan and profile sketch of the Lapérouse class

The four ships of the Lapérouse class were ordered under the auspices of the naval plan of 1872, which was laid out to modernize the French Navy in the aftermath of the Franco-Prussian War of 1870–1871. The navy sought new unprotected cruisers that carried a heavier armament than earlier vessels, while maintaining a similar size to keep costs from increasing during a period of limited naval budgets. The design for the ships was drawn up by Arthur Bienaymé as part of a competition that also resulted in the subsequent and very similar Villars-class cruisers. The Lapérouse-class ships were intended to serve overseas in the French colonial empire.

Lapérouse was 79.5 m (260 ft 10 in) long at the waterline, with a beam of 11.4 m (37 ft 5 in) and an average draft of 5.3 m (17 ft 5 in). She displaced 2,320 t (2,280 long tons; 2,560 short tons) as designed. The ship had a ram bow and an overhanging stern. Her crew amounted to 264 officers and enlisted men. The ship's propulsion system consisted of a single compound steam engine driving a screw propeller. Steam was provided by six coal-burning fire-tube boilers that were ducted into a pair of funnels placed side-by-side. Her machinery was rated to produce 2,160 indicated horsepower (1,610 kW) for a top speed of 15 knots (28 km/h; 17 mph). At a more economical speed of 10 knots (19 km/h; 12 mph), the ship could steam for 4,980 nautical miles (9,220 km; 5,730 mi). She had a full ship rig to supplement her steam engine on long voyages overseas.

The ship was armed with a main battery of fifteen 138.6 mm (5.46 in) M1870M 21.3-caliber guns. Two were placed atop the forecastle as chase guns, one was on the stern, and the remainder were placed in an amidships battery on the upper deck, six guns per broadside. The broadside guns were in pivot mounts firing through embrasures. A pair of 37 mm (1.5 in) Hotchkiss revolver cannon provided close-range defense against torpedo boats. She also carried four 86.5 mm (3.41 in) bronze cannon that could be sent ashore with a landing party or used to arm the ship's boats.

== Service history ==
The keel for Lapérouse was laid down at the Arsenal de Brest shipyard in Brest on 23 June 1875. She was launched on 5 November 1877, and she was commissioned to begin sea trials on 6 October 1879. She conducted full-power tests on 22 December, where she reached a maximum speed of 15.15 knots (28.06 km/h; 17.43 mph), slightly exceeding her design speed. Her initial testing was completed in early March 1880, and on the 7th she was placed in the 2nd category of reserve; she was later reduced to the 3rd category on 7 August 1881. During this period, the number of 37 mm guns was increased to eight. The ship was finally recommissioned for active service on 1 December 1884 for a deployment to East Asia to reinforce the Far East Squadron.

By the time the ship had arrived in the western Pacific Ocean in January 1885, France was engaged in the Sino-French War that had begun over Chinese objections to French interference in Tonkin (now Vietnam). Lapérouse joined the blockade of Formosa; the cruisers committed to the blockade included her sister D'Estaing, and Villars, Champlain, Rigault de Genouilly, and Éclaireur. The ships were based at Tainan, toward the southern end of the island. In March, the French commander, Admiral Amédée Courbet, sent Lapérouse, Nielly, Champlain, Rigault de Genouilly, and the gunboat Vipère to blockade the mouth of the Yangtze river on mainland China. The French blockade effort, which included other ports, proved to be effective at interrupting the movement of rice crops from southern China north. By this time, secret negotiations between French and Chinese representatives had already begun, as both countries were losing patience with the costly war, and in April, an agreement was reached that was formally signed on 9 June, ending the war. After the end of the war in June, many of the French vessels were either recalled home or dispersed to other stations, but Lapérouse remained in the Far East Squadron, along with the ironclads La Galissonnière (the flagship), Turenne, and Triomphante, the cruisers Primauguet, Roland, and Champlain, and two gunboats.

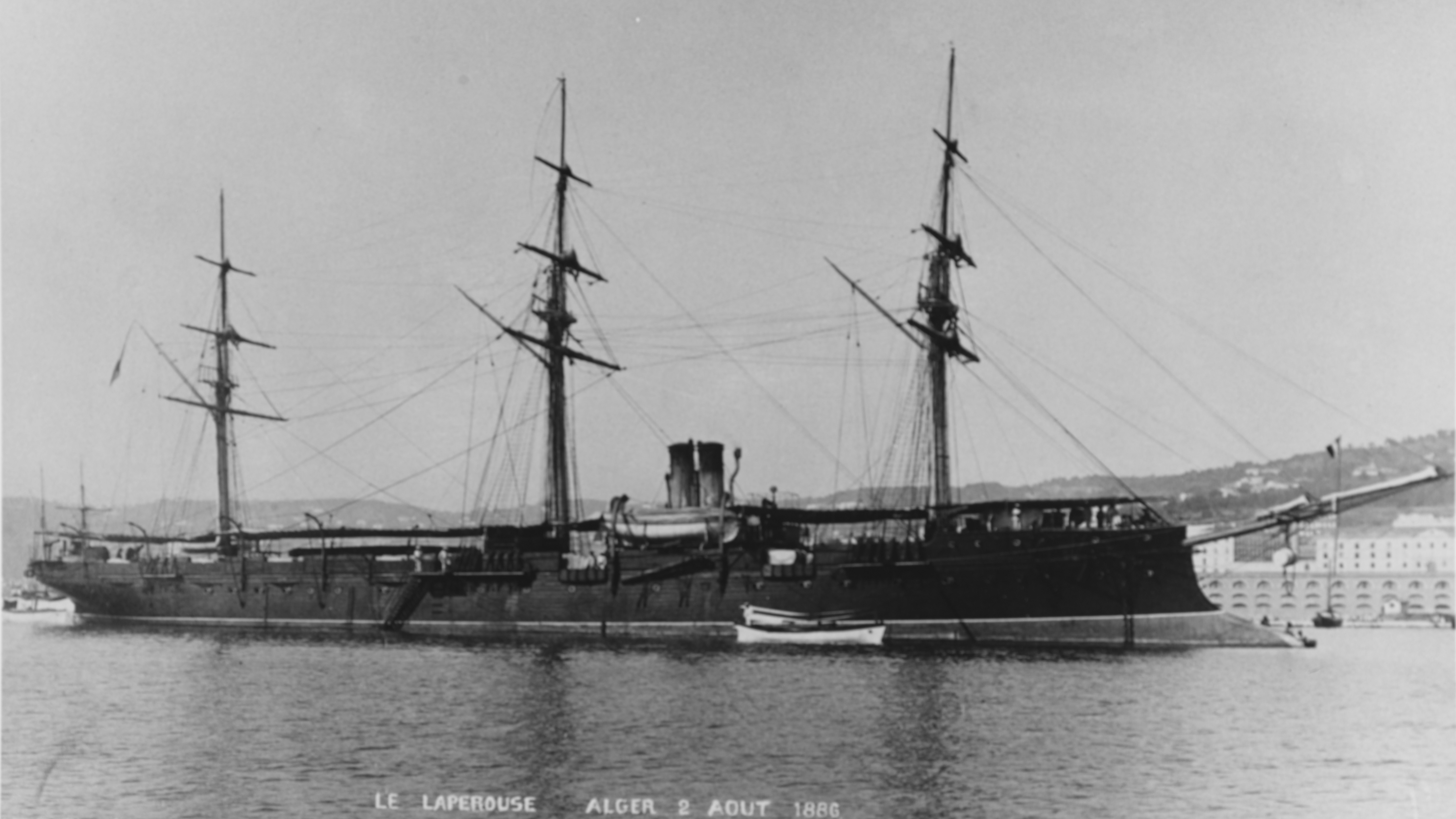
Lapérouse at Algiers on 2 August 1886

In 1886, she was transferred to a squadron that operated in the Indian Ocean, which also included the cruisers Forfait, Naïade, and Limier, the gunboats Pique, Chacal, and Capricorne, and the aviso Labourdonnais. The ships were supported by a pair of transport vessels. By 1891, Lapérouse had been laid up in reserve, but she was mobilized to take part in that year's fleet exercises as part of the Reserve Division. The exercises began in June and culminated with a mock attack on the port of Toulon on 18 July. During the maneuvers, on 26 June, Lapérouse suffered a minor breakdown of her steering gear. Later during the exercises, the ship lost contact with the rest of her squadron and she was captured by the other squadron.

On 1 January 1896, Lapérouse was recommissioned at Toulon for another deployment to the Indian Ocean station, where she was to relieve her sister Primauguet as the divisional flagship; the latter returned to Toulon to be decommissioned. At that time, the unit also included the cruiser Dupetit-Thouars and four gunboats. In 1897, Dupetit-Thouars was relieved by the cruiser Fabert, and two of the gunboats departed. On 31 July 1898, Lapérouse was waiting to take on coal at Fort Dauphin in French Madagascar when a storm drove her ashore and wrecked her. According to some reports, her anchor chains were broken after having struck a submerged wreck. She was still the divisional flagship at the time, and in addition to the division's commanding officer, she also had General Joseph Gallieni, the governor of Madagascar, aboard. Her entire crew survived the incident, and the ship's guns were later salvaged, along with the provisions the ship had had aboard. The ship was formally struck from the naval register on 14 December, and she was eventually sold for scrap on 15 January 1901, to be broken up.
