= French cruiser Nielly =

French naval vessel (1881–1902)

- Nielly in port, date unknown

History

France
- Name: Nielly
- Namesake: Joseph-Marie Nielly
- Builder: Arsenal de Brest
- Laid down: 16 August 1876
- Launched: 25 May 1880
- Commissioned: 1 January 1881
- Decommissioned: May 1901
- Stricken: 18 January 1902
- Fate: Sold for scrap, 1902

General characteristics
- Class & type: Lapérouse-class cruiser
- Displacement: 2,320 t (2,280 long tons)
- Length: 79.5 m (260 ft 10 in) lwl
- Beam: 11.4 m (37 ft 5 in)
- Draft: 5.3 m (17 ft 5 in)
- Installed power: 6 × fire-tube boilers; 2,160 ihp (1,610 kW)
- Propulsion: 1 × compound steam engine; 1 × screw propeller
- Sail plan: Full ship rig
- Speed: 15 knots (28 km/h; 17 mph)
- Range: 4,980 nmi (9,220 km; 5,730 mi) at 10 knots (19 km/h; 12 mph)
- Complement: 264
- Armament: 15 × 138.6 mm (5.46 in) guns; 2 × 37 mm (1.5 in) Hotchkiss revolver cannon

Nielly was an unprotected cruiser of the Lapérouse class built for the French Navy in the 1870s and 1880s. The ship was intended to serve abroad in the French colonial empire, and was ordered to strengthen the fleet after the French defeat in the Franco-Prussian War. To allow the ship to cruise for long distances, she was fitted with a full ship rig to supplement her steam engine, and she carried a main battery of fifteen 138.6 mm (5.46 in) guns. Her top speed under steam was 15 knots (28 km/h; 17 mph).

Following the start of the Sino-French War in August 1884, Nielly was mobilized to strengthen the French Far East Squadron under Amédée Courbet. After arriving in late 1884, she joined the blockade of Formosa. In January 1885, Courbet took a group of ships, including Nielly to search for elements of the Chinese Nanyang Fleet, which were reported to be steaming to attack the blockade force. During the Battle of Shipu, Nielly and the other vessels failed to catch the faster Chinese cruisers, but trapped a pair of smaller vessels Shipu, which were later sunk by French launches armed with spar torpedoes. After the war ended later that year, Nielly shifted to the Indian Ocean, where she was present for the final stage of the First Madagascar expedition, which secured a protectorate over the island. She joined the Atlantic squadron in the early 1890s, and by 1899, she had returned to Madagascar, before returning to France in 1901. She was ultimately sold to ship breakers the following year.

== Design ==
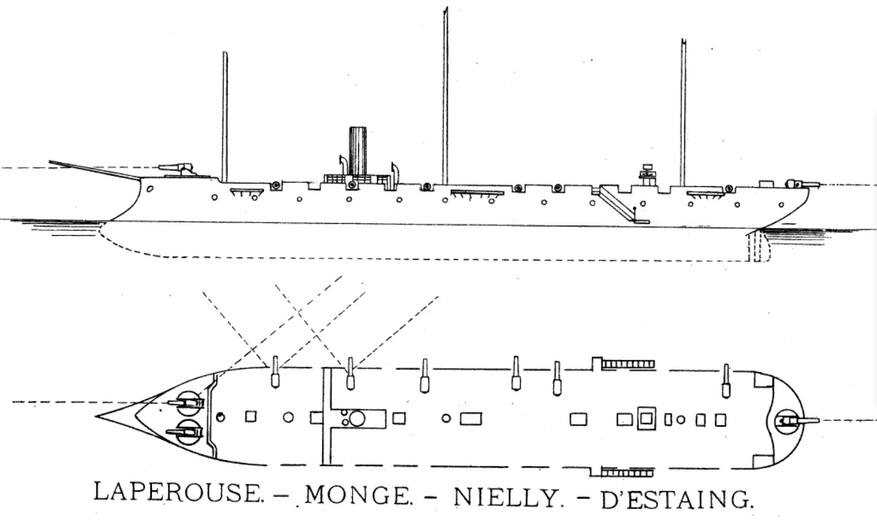
Plan and profile sketch of the Lapérouse class

The four ships of the Lapérouse class were ordered under the auspices of the naval plan of 1872, which was laid out to modernize the French Navy in the aftermath of the Franco-Prussian War of 1870–1871. The navy sought new unprotected cruisers that carried a heavier armament than earlier vessels, while maintaining a similar size to keep costs from increasing during a period of limited naval budgets. The design for the ships was drawn up by Arthur Bienaymé as part of a competition that also resulted in the subsequent and very similar Villars-class cruisers. The Lapérouse-class ships were intended to serve overseas in the French colonial empire.

Nielly was 79.5 m (260 ft 10 in) long at the waterline, with a beam of 11.4 m (37 ft 5 in) and an average draft of 5.3 m (17 ft 5 in). She displaced 2,320 t (2,280 long tons; 2,560 short tons) as designed. The ship had a ram bow and an overhanging stern. Her crew amounted to 264 officers and enlisted men. The ship's propulsion system consisted of a single compound steam engine driving a screw propeller. Steam was provided by six coal-burning fire-tube boilers that were ducted into a pair of funnels placed side-by-side. Her machinery was rated to produce 2,160 indicated horsepower (1,610 kW) for a top speed of 15 knots (28 km/h; 17 mph). At a more economical speed of 10 knots (19 km/h; 12 mph), the ship could steam for 4,980 nautical miles (9,220 km; 5,730 mi). She had a full ship rig to supplement her steam engine on long voyages overseas.

The ship was armed with a main battery of fifteen 138.6 mm (5.46 in) M1870M 21.3-caliber guns. Two were placed atop the forecastle as chase guns, one was on the stern, and the remainder were placed in an amidships battery on the upper deck, six guns per broadside. The broadside guns were in pivot mounts firing through embrasures. A pair of 37 mm (1.5 in) Hotchkiss revolver cannon provided close-range defense against torpedo boats. She also carried four 86.5 mm (3.41 in) bronze cannon that could be sent ashore with a landing party or used to arm the ship's boats.

== Service history ==
Nielly was laid down at the Arsenal de Brest shipyard in Brest on 16 August 1876. The ship was named for Admiral Joseph-Marie Nielly, noted for his service at the Fourth Battle of Ushant. Her completed hull was launched on 25 May 1880, and she was commissioned to begin sea trials on 1 January 1881. She carried out full-power tests on 10 March, during which she made 15.22 knots (28.19 km/h; 17.51 mph). Her initial testing was completed later that month, and on 26 March she was placed in the 2nd category of reserve. She was reduced to the 3rd category of reserve on 7 August, and remained there until 22 August 1884, when she was recommissioned for a deployment to the Far East. During her time in reserve, the ship had another five 37 mm guns installed to strengthen her defense against torpedo boats.

=== Sino-French War ===
Nielly arrived in East Asia by October, by which time the Sino-French War had begun over Chinese objections to the French interference in Tonkin during the Tonkin campaign. By then, the Far East Squadron, commanded by Rear Admiral Amédée Courbet, that time, also included the ironclad warships La Galissonnière (the flagship) and Triomphante, the unprotected cruisers Duguay-Trouin, Villars, D'Estaing, Volta, Rigault de Genouilly, and Champlain, and the gunboat Lutin. The French squadron had already annihilated the Chinese Fujian Fleet at the Battle of Fuzhou and embarked on a blockade of Formosa to support the Keelung campaign, and Nielly joined the squadron there. The blockade was not particularly effective, however, as the French lacked sufficient numbers of vessels to enforce it.

==== Battle of Shipu ====
Map of French and Chinese dispositions at the Battle of Shipu

In January 1885, Courbet received word that elements of the Chinese Nanyang Fleet under Admiral Wu Ankang had sortied and were steaming south to try to break the blockade of Formosa. Accordingly, he assembled a force that included Nielly, the ironclads Bayard and Triomphante, the cruiser Éclaireur, and the gunboat Aspic, along with a supporting transport. He ordered Nielly and Triomphante to meet his other ships at Matsu at the mouth of the Min river on 3 February. By this time, the cruiser Duguay-Trouin had also joined Courbet's squadron. Courbet initially believed the Chinese squadron would attempt to reach Fuzhou via the Min river and sought to block their path on 6 February. The Chinese squadron was not there, and so Courbet took his ships north to Zhoushan to search for the Nanyang Fleet on 7 February. They arrived there four days later to find the harbor empty, so the French steamed further north to search the mouth of the Yangtze river. Duguay-Trouin was short of coal, so he ordered her to Keelung to coal.

By 12 February, Courbet had received word that Wu's ships had been spotted in Samsen Bay near Ningbo, so he ordered his ships cleared for action and back south. At dawn the following morning, lookouts aboard Éclaireur spotted five ships in the distance at about 07:00. Wu's squadron consisted of the unprotected cruisers Kai Chi, Nan Chen, and Nan Shui, the steam frigate Yuyuen, and the sloop Teng Ching; he had initially sought battle with the French, but upon realizing the superiority of Courbet's squadron, Wu decided to detach the slower Yuyuen and Teng Ching to seek shelter in Shipu, while his faster cruisers fled south. Courbet ordered his ships to steam at least 13 knots (24 km/h; 15 mph) to try to catch Wu's cruisers, but Triomphante and Aspic could not keep this speed and so he sent them to blockade Yuyuen and Teng Ching in Shipu. Courbet continued his pursuit of Wu with Nielly, Éclaireur, and Bayard, but he soon realized that he could not catch the Chinese ships, which were capable of 14 to 15 knots (26 to 28 km/h; 16 to 17 mph), and so he rejoined the rest of his squadron at Shipu at around 13:00.

Unable to enter the narrow waterways that led to Shipu's harbor, Courbet arrayed his ships to block the largest channels out and then sent steam launches to explore the approaches to the harbor. With the knowledge gained, he sent a pair of launches armed with spar torpedoes on the night of 14–15 February to attack the two Chinese vessels, sinking them both. The French learned that both vessels had been sunk on 16 February, allowing them to end the blockade. Nielly and Triomphante sailed for Keelung, while the rest of the squadron departed for Matsu. In March, the French commander, Courbet sent Nielly, Lapérouse, Champlain, Rigault de Genouilly, and the gunboat Vipère to blockade the mouth of the Yangtze river on mainland China. The French blockade effort, which included other ports, proved to be effective at interrupting the movement of rice crops from southern China north. By this time, secret negotiations between French and Chinese representatives had already begun, as both countries were losing patience with the costly war, and in April, an agreement was reached that was formally signed on 9 June, ending the war.

=== Later career ===
With the conflict over, the French began dispersing the warships that had gathered in East Asia; Nielly was transferred to the Indian Ocean division. She arrived there in late 1885, as the First Madagascar expedition was nearing its close; when the conflict ended in December that year, Nielly was sent to neighboring Zanzibar to announce the establishment of a French protectorate over Madagascar. In 1887, Nielly replaced the cruiser Naïade as the flagship of the Indian Ocean division.

By the end of the 1880s, Nielly had returned to France. She was scheduled to take part in the fleet maneuvers for 1890, but she was damaged in an accident just before the exercises were to begin, and so she was unable to participate. The following year, Nielly was stationed at Brest, along with the cruisers Forfait and Éclaireur and the coastal defense ships Fulminant and Tempête. The ships were mobilized in June to take part in limited training exercises. The ships were kept in commission for the mandatory 28 days, and were sent to sea individually for training; no organized maneuvers were held that year.

By 1893, Nielly had joined the Atlantic squadron, which also included Naïade and Rigault de Genouilly. In September, the three ships visited Boston in the United States. The three ships continued to cruise together the following year. That year, she patrolled the fisheries off Iceland and then met the other two cruisers at Saint Pierre Island. In February 1895, the unit returned to Brest, where it was temporarily deactivated; Nielly and the other two cruisers were placed in the 2nd category of reserve. By that time, the ship's boilers were in poor condition, so the crew reduced their operating pressure so they could still be used.

In early 1899, Nielly was sent back to the Indian Ocean division. During the Boer War, Nielly was sent to intercept the French merchant vessel Geronde, which was falsely said to be carrying arms to the Boer republics. By 1900, her boilers had continued to deteriorate, necessitating further reduction in operating pressure. She was still operating on the station by early 1901, which at that time also included D'Estaing, the protected cruiser Catinat, and the gunboat Scorpion. On 15 March, the protected cruiser Infernet was commissioned to relieve Nielly in the Indian Ocean. By May, Nielly had arrived in Brest, where she was paid off into the 2nd category of reserve. The ship was struck from the naval register on 18 January 1902, allocated for sale on 24 May, and was sold on 25 September to ship breakers in Brest.
