= French cruiser Roland =

French naval vessel of the 1880s

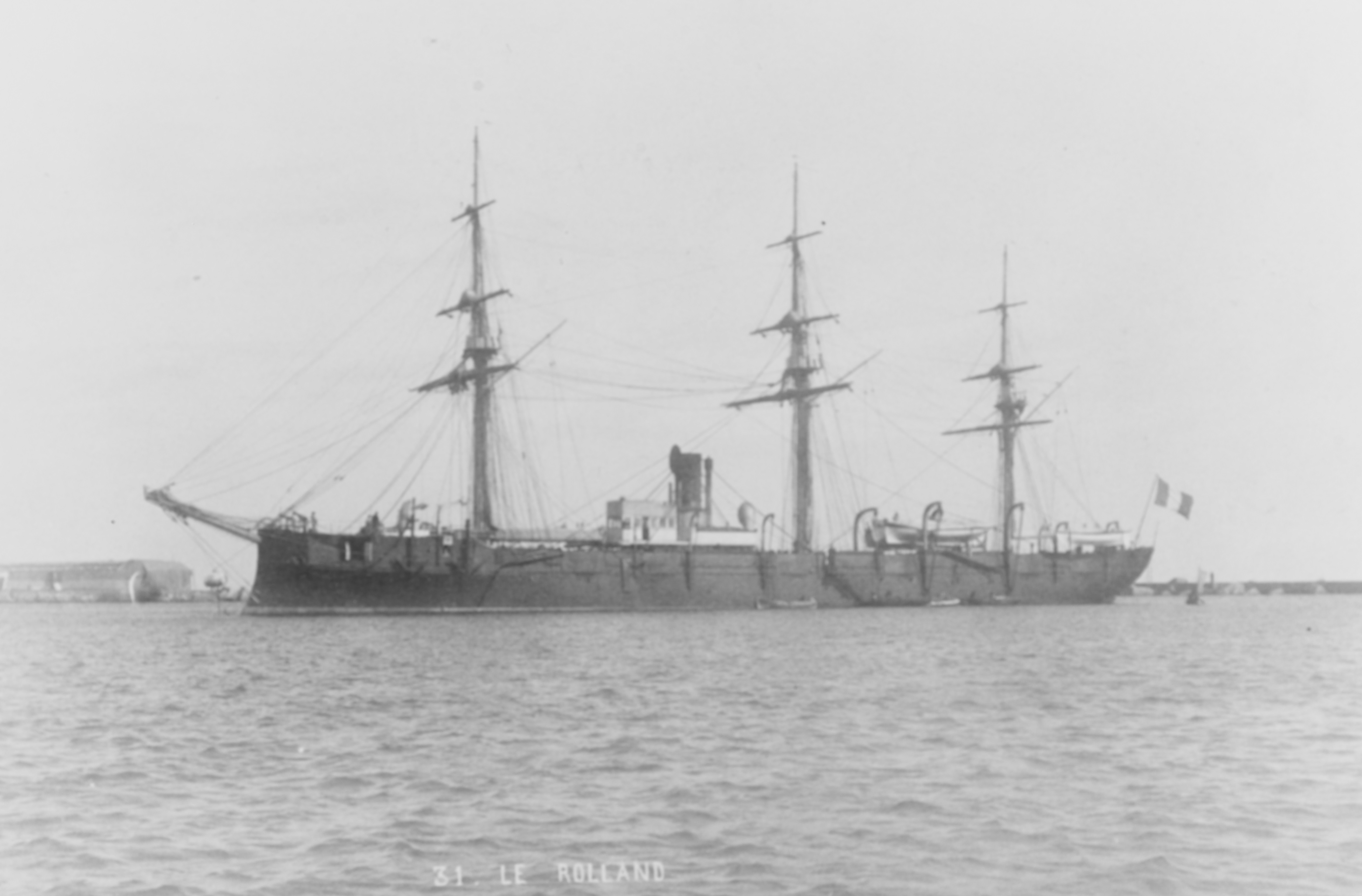
- Roland

History

France
- Name: Roland
- Namesake: Pierre-Nicolas Rolland
- Builder: Arsenal de Cherbourg
- Laid down: 2 July 1877
- Launched: 14 October 1882
- Commissioned: 25 March 1884
- Decommissioned: 1897
- Stricken: 19 May 1897
- Fate: Sold for scrap, 5 November 1898

General characteristics
- Class & type: Villars-class cruiser
- Displacement: 2,419 t (2,381 long tons)
- Length: 74.27 m (243 ft 8 in) lwl
- Beam: 11.6 m (38 ft 1 in)
- Draft: 5.31 m (17 ft 5 in)
- Installed power: 6 × fire-tube boilers; 2,700 ihp (2,000 kW)
- Propulsion: 1 × compound steam engine; 1 × screw propeller
- Sail plan: Full ship rig
- Speed: 14.6 knots (27.0 km/h; 16.8 mph)
- Range: 4,810 nmi (8,910 km; 5,540 mi) at 10 knots (19 km/h; 12 mph)
- Complement: 269
- Armament: 15 × 138.6 mm (5.46 in) guns; 2 × 37 mm (1.5 in) Hotchkiss revolver cannon

Roland was an unprotected cruiser of the Villars class built for the French Navy in the 1870s, the fourth and final member of the class. The ships were designed for service in the French colonial empire, and they carried a relatively heavy battery of fifteen 138.6 mm (5.46 in) guns, and could steam at a speed of 14.5 knots (26.9 km/h; 16.7 mph). The ship was laid down in 1877 and she was completed in 1884. She was deployed to East Asia during the Sino-French War in January 1885, but the conflict had ended by the time she arrived. After completing her tour in East Asian waters, she served a stint in the North Atlantic Squadron from 1890, a role she filled for much of the decade, between periods out of service in reserve. Roland was ultimately struck from the naval register in 1897 and sold for scrap the following year.

== Design ==
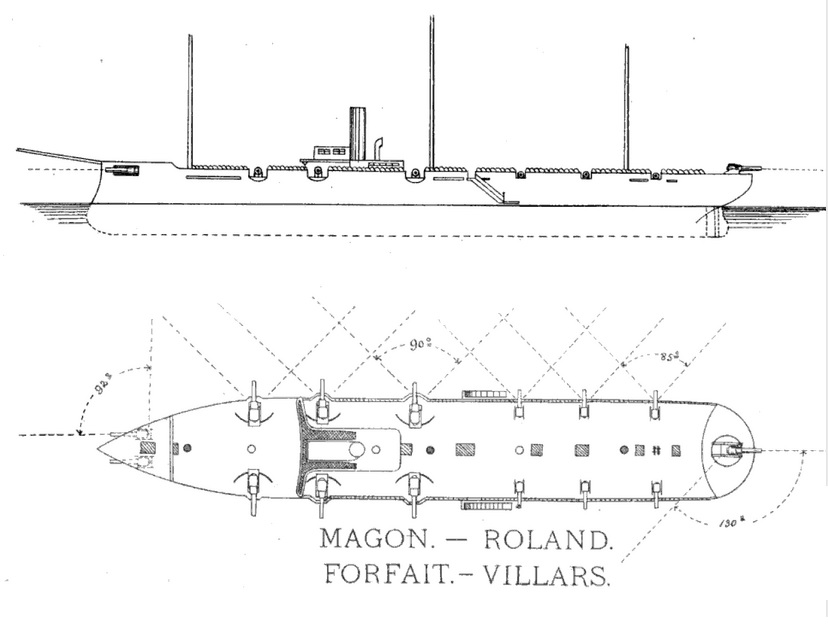
Plan and profile view of the Villars class

The four ships of the Villars class were ordered under the auspices of the naval plan of 1872, which was laid out to modernize the French Navy in the aftermath of the Franco-Prussian War of 1870–1871. The navy sought new unprotected cruisers that carried a heavier armament than earlier vessels, while maintaining a similar size to keep costs from increasing during a period of limited naval budgets. The design for the ships was drawn up by Victorin Sabattier. The vessels were intended to serve overseas in the French colonial empire.

Roland was 74.27 m (243 ft 8 in) long at the waterline, with a beam of 11.6 m (38 ft 1 in) and an average draft of 5.3 m (17 ft 5 in). She displaced 2,419 t (2,381 long tons; 2,666 short tons) as designed. The ship had a ram bow and an overhanging stern. Her crew amounted to 269 officers and enlisted men. The ship's propulsion system consisted of a single compound steam engine driving a screw propeller. Steam was provided by six coal-burning fire-tube boilers that were ducted into a single funnel. Her machinery was rated to produce 2,700 indicated horsepower (2,000 kW) for a top speed of 14.5 knots (26.9 km/h; 16.7 mph). At a more economical speed of 10 knots (19 km/h; 12 mph), the ship could steam for 4,810 nautical miles (8,910 km; 5,540 mi).

The ship was armed with a main battery of fifteen 138.6 mm (5.46 in) M1870M 21.3-caliber guns. Two were placed in the forecastle, firing through embrasures as chase guns, one was atop the stern, and the remainder were placed in an amidships battery on the upper deck, six guns per broadside. Of the broadside guns, the forward three on each side were placed in sponsons, while the remaining three guns were in pivot mounts firing through embrasures. A pair of 37 mm (1.5 in) Hotchkiss revolver cannon provided close-range defense against torpedo boats. She also carried a pair of 86.5 mm (3.41 in) bronze mountain guns or a single 65 mm (2.6 in) field gun that could be sent ashore with a landing party.

== Service history ==
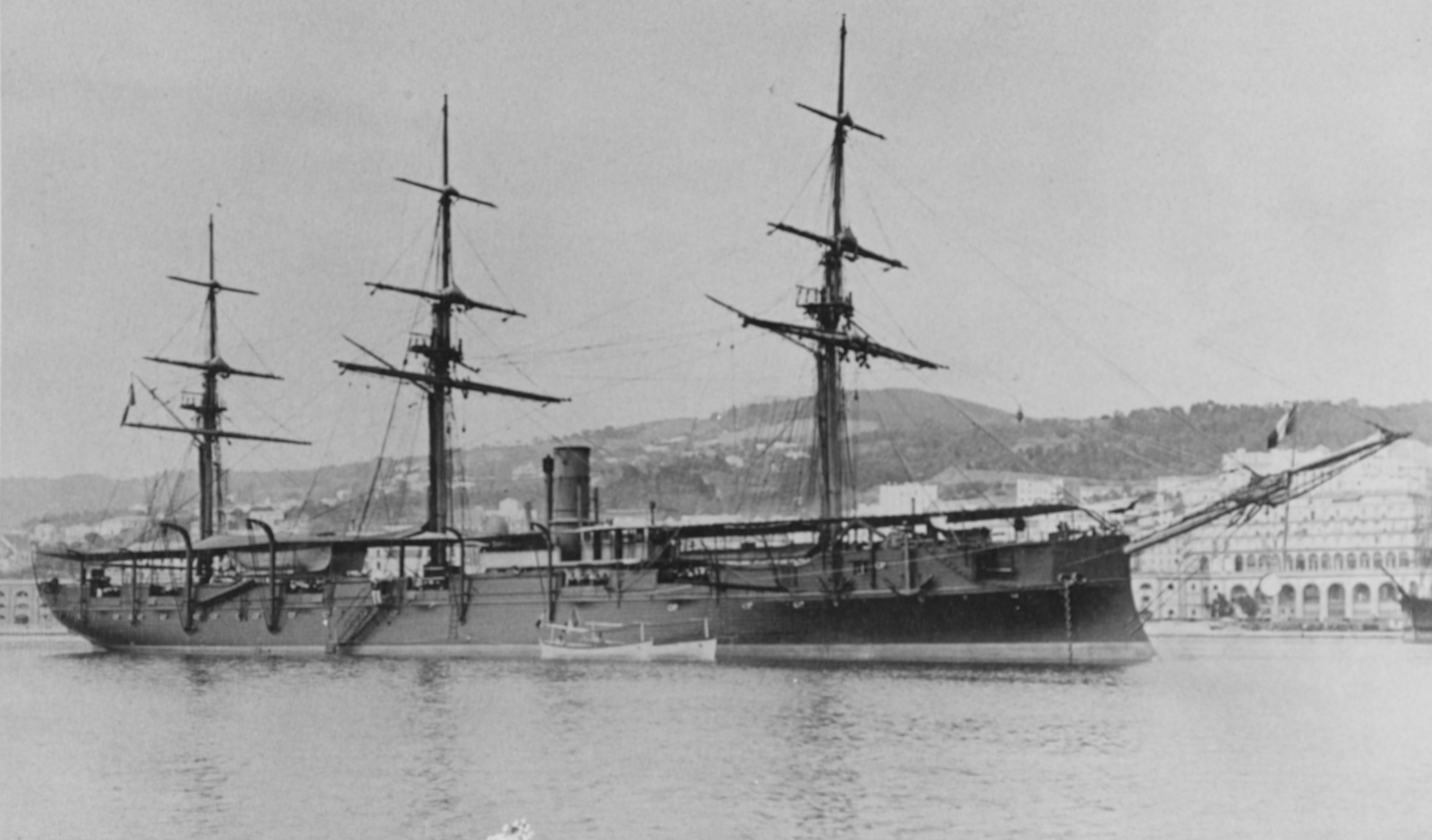
Roland in Algiers, French Algeria, in 1886

The keel for Roland was laid down at the Arsenal de Cherbourg (Cherbourg Naval Base) on 2 July 1877, though some assembly work had already begun on 8 May; she was the last member of the class to be built. The ship, named after Rear Admiral Pierre-Nicolas Rolland (and is therefore sometimes referred to as Rolland), was launched on 14 October 1882. She was commissioned to begin sea trials on 25 March 1884, including full power testing carried out on 15 July. The ship was pronounced completed the following month, and on 1 August she was allocated to the 2nd category of reserve. She was transferred to the 3rd category of reserve on 5 November, before being commissioned on 21 January 1885 for a deployment to French Indochina in East Asia during the Sino-French War.

The ship was sent to reinforce the Escadre de l'Extrême-Orient (Far East Squadron), along with the ironclad warship Turenne and the cruisers Magon, Primauguet, Limier, and Hugon, and several gunboats and smaller craft. The ships departed Brest on 21 February and stopped in Algiers, French Algeria, on 3 March while en route. By 25 April, they had arrived on station in French Indochina, though a preliminary peace agreement had already been signed on 4 April, so the ships saw no action during the war. After the end of the war in June, many of the French vessels were either recalled home or dispersed to other stations, but Roland remained in the unit, along with the ironclads La Galissonnière (the flagship), Turenne, and Triomphante, the cruisers Lapérouse, Primauguet and Champlain, and two gunboats.

In 1890, the ship had been assigned to the North Atlantic Squadron, along with the unprotected cruisers Aréthuse, Kerguélen, and Sané and the sloop Bisson. During the First Franco-Dahomean War in 1890, Roland and the cruiser Naïade were present in Lagos in August 1890. Dahomean forces launched an attack on French positions at nearby Cotonou on the night of 11 August. Both cruisers used their electric searchlights to illuminate enemy forces for the French garrison to engage them.

Roland thereafter returned to France, where she was laid up in the 3rd category of reserve for the duration of 1891. She was reactivated in September 1894 to relieve Magon on the North Atlantic Squadron. The following year, the unit consisted of Roland, the cruiser Duquesne, and a sloop. She was still in service on the North American station in 1896, along with the unprotected cruiser Dubourdieu. The following year, Roland was replaced by the unprotected cruiser Rigault de Genouilly. Roland was struck from the naval register on 19 May 1897 and sold at Lorient on 5 November 1898 to be broken up.
