= French cruiser Primauguet (1882) =

French Navy warship

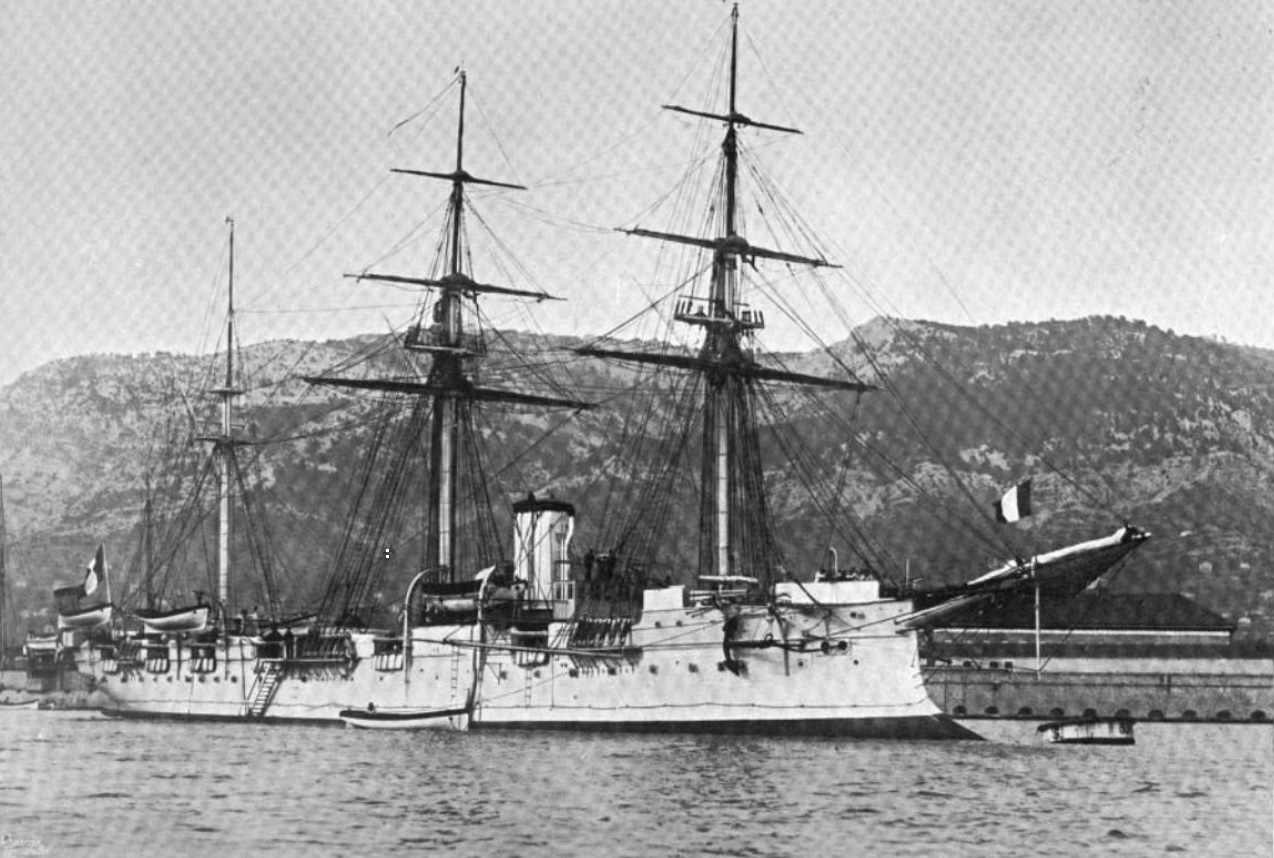
- Primauguet's sister ship Lapérouse

History

France
- Name: Primauguet
- Builder: Arsenal de Rochefort
- Laid down: 10 January 1877
- Launched: 27 September 1882
- Commissioned: 1883
- Decommissioned: 1896
- In service: 14 November 1883
- Stricken: 13 February 1901
- Fate: Sold for scrap, 1907

General characteristics
- Class & type: Lapérouse-class cruiser
- Displacement: 2,320 t (2,280 long tons)
- Length: 79.5 m (260 ft 10 in) lwl
- Beam: 11.4 m (37 ft 5 in)
- Draft: 5.3 m (17 ft 5 in)
- Installed power: 6 × fire-tube boilers; 2,160 ihp (1,610 kW)
- Propulsion: 1 × compound steam engine; 1 × screw propeller
- Sail plan: Full ship rig
- Speed: 15 knots (28 km/h; 17 mph)
- Range: 4,980 nmi (9,220 km; 5,730 mi) at 10 knots (19 km/h; 12 mph)
- Complement: 264
- Armament: 15 × 138.6 mm (5.46 in) guns; 2 × 37 mm (1.5 in) Hotchkiss revolver cannon

Primauguet was an unprotected cruiser of the Lapérouse class built for the French Navy in the 1870s and 1880s. She was originally named Monge, but was renamed during construction. The ship was intended to serve abroad in the French colonial empire, and was ordered to strengthen the fleet after the French defeat in the Franco-Prussian War. To allow the ship to cruise for long distances, she was fitted with a full ship rig to supplement her steam engine, and she carried a main battery of fifteen 138.6 mm (5.46 in) guns. Her top speed under steam was 15 knots (28 km/h; 17 mph).

Primauguet was initially sent to join the Far East Squadron during the Sino-French War, but she arrived shortly before the end of the conflict and did not see action. In the early 1890s, the ship was stationed in Brest, France. In 1894, she was sent to the Indian Ocean division, where she became the flagship. She participated in the Second Madagascar expedition that began later that year. She supported French troops fighting on the island until the Merina government surrendered. Primauguet returned to France after the war ended in 1896; a refit scheduled for 1898 was cancelled and the ship was instead removed from service in 1901. Converted into a mooring hulk, she lingered on in the navy's inventory until 1907, when she was sold to ship breakers.

== Design ==
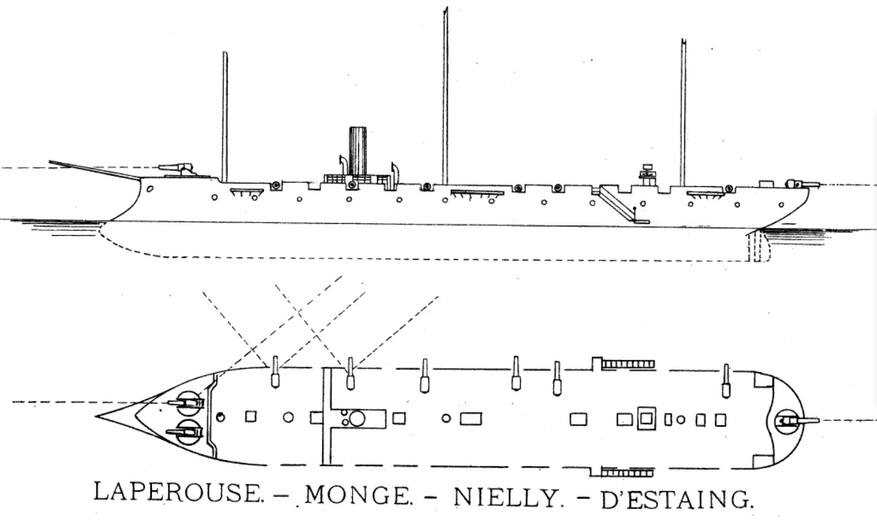
Plan and profile sketch of the Lapérouse class

The four ships of the Lapérouse class were ordered under the auspices of the naval plan of 1872, which was laid out to modernize the French Navy in the aftermath of the Franco-Prussian War of 1870–1871. The navy sought new unprotected cruisers that carried a heavier armament than earlier vessels, while maintaining a similar size to keep costs from increasing during a period of limited naval budgets. The design for the ships was drawn up by Arthur Bienaymé as part of a competition that also resulted in the subsequent and very similar Villars-class cruisers. The Lapérouse-class ships were intended to serve overseas in the French colonial empire.

Primauguet was 79.5 m (260 ft 10 in) long at the waterline, with a beam of 11.4 m (37 ft 5 in) and an average draft of 5.3 m (17 ft 5 in). She displaced 2,320 t (2,280 long tons; 2,560 short tons) as designed. The ship had a ram bow and an overhanging stern. Her crew amounted to 264 officers and enlisted men. The ship's propulsion system consisted of a single compound steam engine driving a screw propeller. Steam was provided by six coal-burning fire-tube boilers that were ducted into a pair of funnels placed side-by-side. Her machinery was rated to produce 2,160 indicated horsepower (1,610 kW) for a top speed of 15 knots (28 km/h; 17 mph). At a more economical speed of 10 knots (19 km/h; 12 mph), the ship could steam for 4,980 nautical miles (9,220 km; 5,730 mi). She had a full ship rig to supplement her steam engine on long voyages overseas.

The ship was armed with a main battery of fifteen 138.6 mm (5.46 in) M1870M 21.3-caliber guns. Two were placed atop the forecastle as chase guns, one was on the stern, and the remainder were placed in an amidships battery on the upper deck, six guns per broadside. The broadside guns were in pivot mounts firing through embrasures. A pair of 37 mm (1.5 in) Hotchkiss revolver cannon provided close-range defense against torpedo boats. She also carried four 86.5 mm (3.41 in) bronze cannon that could be sent ashore with a landing party or used to arm the ship's boats.

== Service history ==
The keel for Primauguet was laid down at the Arsenal de Rochefort shipyard in Rochefort on 10 January 1877; she was the last member of her class to be built. The ship was originally named Monge after an earlier Monge, though that vessel was lost in a storm with her entire crew, so the name was changed to Primauguet on 15 September 1882 to avoid negative morale for her future crews. Her completed hull was launched on 27 September, and she was placed in limited commission for sea trials in 1883. She carried out full-power tests on 27 October, during which she made 15.36 knots (28.45 km/h; 17.68 mph). She was placed in full commission on 14 November to move the ship from Rochefort to Toulon, where she was placed in the 2nd category of reserve on 5 December. While she was in reserve, the number of 37 mm guns was increased to ten. She remained out of service until 15 December 1884, when she was recommissioned for a deployment to the Far East.

The ship was sent to reinforce the Escadre de l'Extrême-Orient (Far East Squadron) during the Sino-French War, along with the ironclad warship Turenne and the cruisers Magon, Roland, Limier, and Hugon, and several gunboats and smaller craft. The ships departed Brest on 21 February 1885 and stopped in Algiers, French Algeria, on 3 March while en route. By 25 April, they had arrived on station in French Indochina, though a preliminary peace agreement had already been signed on 4 April, so the ships saw no action during the war. After the end of the war in June, many of the French vessels were either recalled home or dispersed to other stations, but Primauguet remained in the unit, along with the ironclads La Galissonnière (the flagship), Turenne, and Triomphante, the cruisers Lapérouse, Roland and Champlain, and two gunboats. Primauguet remained in the region through 1887.

By 1889, the ship had returned to France; that year, she underwent an extensive overhaul that included work to her engine and boilers, and alterations to her bridge and rigging. Work continued into 1890. Later that year, Primauguet was stationed at Brest, along with the protected cruiser Sfax and the unprotected cruiser Rigault de Genouilly. The three cruisers were mobilized on 20 June to take part in the fleet maneuvers held that year. Primauguet was assigned to the Second Division for the exercises, which lasted until 28 July. Primaugeut spent ten months of the year 1891 out of service in the 3rd category of reserve. In 1892, the ship underwent another refit that reduced her armament to ten 138.6 mm guns, a single 65 mm (2.6 in) gun, and ten 37 mm guns.

The ship was assigned to the Indian Ocean division by 1892, and at that time, the unit consisted of Primauguet, the cruiser Hugon, the aviso Labourdonnais, two gunboats, and two transports. Primauguet served as the divisional flagship. In 1893, she was called to patrol the east coast of Madagascar, including the town of Vatomandry, owing to significant arms shipments. She was joined there by the cruiser Hugon, which was already on station there. By 1894, the French ships assigned to the division included the aviso Papin, two gunboats, and two other vessels. At the end of the year, the French embarked on the Second Madagascar expedition to conquer the island. At that time, Primauguet still served as the flagship of the division, commanded by Commodore Amédée Bienaimé. At the start of the operation, the unit also included the cruiser Dupetit-Thouars, the avisos Dumont-d'Urville and Papin, and three gunboats, along with supporting transport vessels. On 1 May 1895, Primauguet and the gunboat Lynx escorted the transport Rance up the Betsiboka River to seize the city of Marovoay, the defenses of which were found to have been abandoned. In late September, Primauguet and two transports carried two companies of infantry, around 300 men, and two mountain guns to Tamatave to strengthen the French forces there. They reached the port on 30 September. The war ended shortly thereafter, the Merina Kingdom signing a capitulation on 11 October.

In February 1896, Primauguet briefly became the flagship of Captain Le Dô, after Bienaimé—who had by then been promoted to rear admiral—relinquished command of the Indian Ocean division to return home. The previous month, Lapérouse was commissioned to relieve Primauguet there. After her sister arrived on station, Primauguet departed to be laid up at Toulon. The ship was then moved to Rochefort for a refit that was authorized on 11 January 1897; the work was to include re-boilering, but the plan was cancelled in June 1898 before work began. Primauguet remained out of service in reserve until she was struck from the naval register on 13 February 1901. She was briefly placed for sale before the navy rescinded the listing on 20 November so she could instead be used as a mooring hulk, a role she filled until 1906. She was then sold for scrap on 9 February 1907.
