= French cruiser D'Estaing =

French naval vessel (1880–1901)

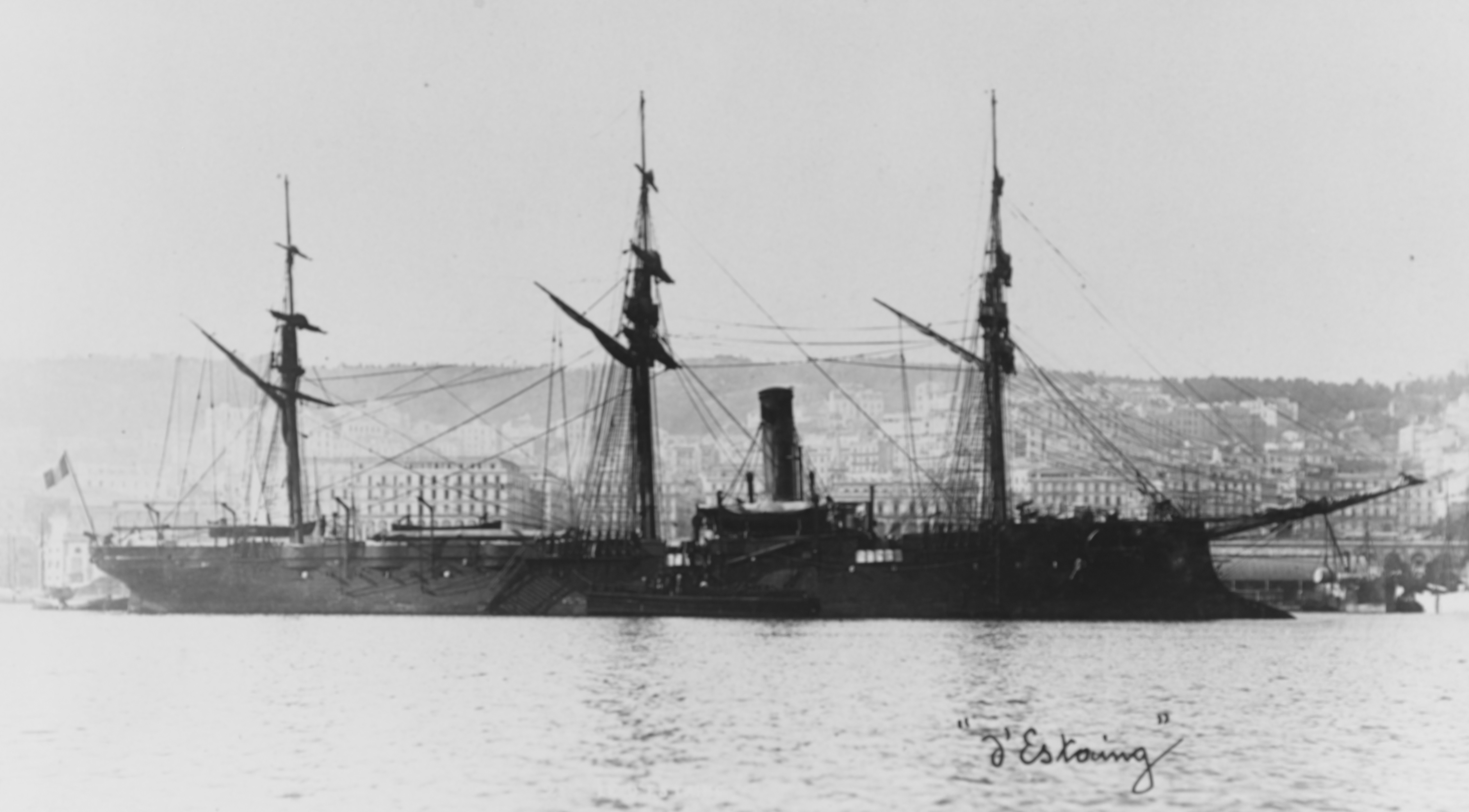
- D'Estaing coaling in Algiers, likely in late 1884

History

France
- Name: D'Estaing
- Builder: Arsenal de Brest
- Laid down: 4 August 1876
- Launched: 16 October 1879
- Commissioned: 1 September 1880
- Stricken: 2 May 1901
- Fate: Sold for scrap, 1902

General characteristics
- Class & type: Lapérouse-class cruiser
- Displacement: 2,320 t (2,280 long tons)
- Length: 79.5 m (260 ft 10 in) lwl
- Beam: 11.4 m (37 ft 5 in)
- Draft: 5.3 m (17 ft 5 in)
- Installed power: 6 × fire-tube boilers; 2,160 ihp (1,610 kW)
- Propulsion: 1 × compound steam engine; 1 × screw propeller
- Sail plan: Full ship rig
- Speed: 15 knots (28 km/h; 17 mph)
- Range: 4,980 nmi (9,220 km; 5,730 mi) at 10 knots (19 km/h; 12 mph)
- Complement: 264
- Armament: 15 × 138.6 mm (5.46 in) guns; 2 × 37 mm (1.5 in) Hotchkiss revolver cannon

D'Estaing was an unprotected cruiser of the Lapérouse class built for the French Navy in the 1870s. The ship was intended to serve abroad in the French colonial empire, and was ordered to strengthen the fleet after the French defeat in the Franco-Prussian War. To allow the ship to cruise for long distances, she was fitted with a full ship rig to supplement her steam engine, and she carried a main battery of fifteen 138.6 mm (5.46 in) guns. Her top speed under steam was 15 knots (28 km/h; 17 mph).

The ship was sent to East Asia in 1883 to join the Far East Squadron under Amédée Courbet. As France sought to expand the empire with the Tonkin campaign in northern Vietnam, war with Qing China became increasingly likely, and after skirmishes with Chinese forces escalated, Courbet took many of his ships, including D'Estaing, to attack the Chinese Fujian Fleet in the Battle of Fuzhou in August 1884. D'Estaing next saw action at the Battle of Tamsui, supporting an amphibious assault on Formosa that was defeated by the Chinese defenders. She participated in the subsequent blockade of Formosa and the Pescadores campaign. After the war ended in 1885, D'Estaing was recalled to France, and in the early 1890s, she was overhauled. She cruised in the Caribbean Sea later in the decade and was present in Cuba during the Spanish–American War in 1898. Later that year, she replaced her sister ship Lapérouse after the latter was wrecked in Madagascar. D'Estaing returned to France in 1900, where she was struck from the naval register, to be sold for scrap the following year.

== Design ==
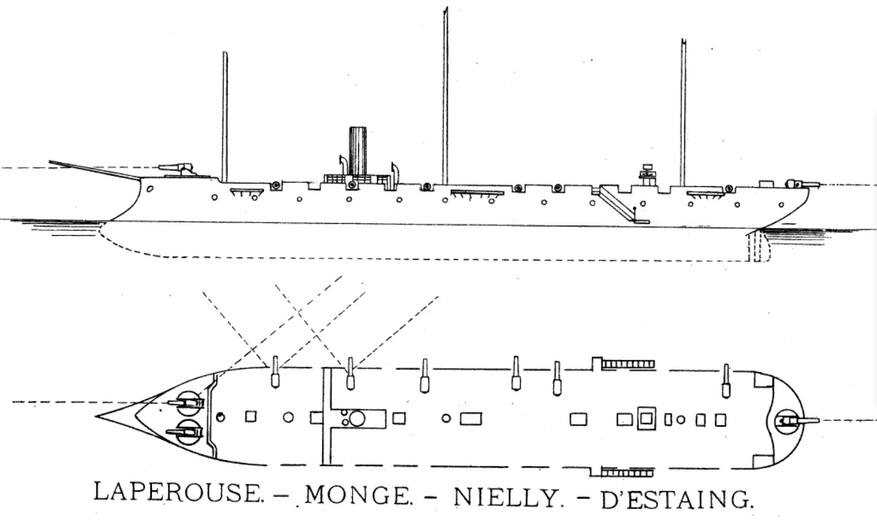
Plan and profile sketch of the Lapérouse class

The four ships of the Lapérouse class were ordered under the auspices of the naval plan of 1872, which was laid out to modernize the French Navy in the aftermath of the Franco-Prussian War of 1870–1871. The navy sought new unprotected cruisers that carried a heavier armament than earlier vessels, while maintaining a similar size to keep costs from increasing during a period of limited naval budgets. The design for the ships was drawn up by Arthur Bienaymé as part of a competition that also resulted in the subsequent and very similar Villars-class cruisers. The Lapérouse-class ships were intended to serve overseas in the French colonial empire.

D'Estaing was 79.5 m (260 ft 10 in) long at the waterline, with a beam of 11.4 m (37 ft 5 in) and an average draft of 5.3 m (17 ft 5 in). She displaced 2,320 t (2,280 long tons; 2,560 short tons) as designed. The ship had a ram bow and an overhanging stern. Her crew amounted to 264 officers and enlisted men. The ship's propulsion system consisted of a single compound steam engine driving a screw propeller. Steam was provided by six coal-burning fire-tube boilers that were ducted into a single funnel. Her machinery was rated to produce 2,160 indicated horsepower (1,610 kW) for a top speed of 15 knots (28 km/h; 17 mph). At a more economical speed of 10 knots (19 km/h; 12 mph), the ship could steam for 4,980 nautical miles (9,220 km; 5,730 mi). She had a full ship rig to supplement her steam engine on long voyages overseas.

The ship was armed with a main battery of fifteen 138.6 mm (5.46 in) M1870M 21.3-caliber guns. Two were placed atop the forecastle as chase guns, one was on the stern, and the remainder were placed in an amidships battery on the upper deck, six guns per broadside. The broadside guns were in pivot mounts firing through embrasures. A pair of 37 mm (1.5 in) Hotchkiss revolver cannon provided close-range defense against torpedo boats. She also carried four 86.5 mm (3.41 in) bronze cannon that could be sent ashore with a landing party or used to arm the ship's boats.

== Service history ==
D'Estaing was laid down at the Arsenal de Brest shipyard in Brest on 4 August 1876. Her completed hull was launched on 16 October 1879, and she was commissioned to begin sea trials on 1 September 1880. She carried out full-power tests on 15 March 1881, during which she made 15.3 knots (28.3 km/h; 17.6 mph). The ship was pronounced ready for service on 1 April, though she was initially placed in the 2nd category of reserve. She was reduced to the 3rd category of reserve on 7 August, where she remained until 1883, when she was recommissioned for further trials. During this period, her number of 37 mm guns was increased to eight. On 31 December, she departed for the Far East, where she was to join the Far East Squadron commanded by Rear Admiral Amédée Courbet. At the time, tensions in the region had risen considerably, particularly after the Battle of Hanoi in April 1882, and the French began sending naval reinforcements in 1883 to strengthen their position during the Tonkin campaign.

=== Sino-French War ===
She had arrived in the region by March 1884, and at that time, the squadron also included the ironclad warships La Galissonnière (the flagship) and Triomphante, the unprotected cruisers Duguay-Trouin, Villars, and Volta, and the gunboat Lutin. France's campaign to occupy Vietnam, a traditional subject of Qing China, led to clashes between French and Chinese forces, and ultimately, to the start of the Sino-French War in August 1884 with the Keelung campaign on the island of Formosa early that month. Following the action there, Courbet began assembling ships off Fuzhou to attack the Chinese Fujian Fleet that was stationed there. D'Estaing reached the squadron there on 16 August.

==== Battle of Fuzhou ====
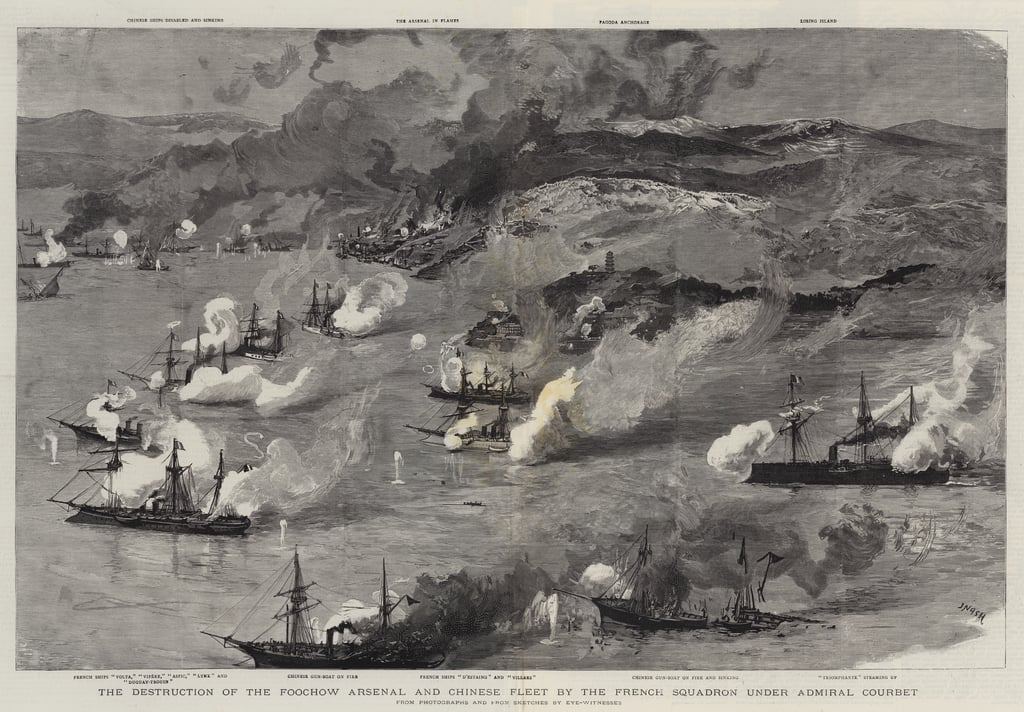
The Battle of Fuzhou; D'Estaing is in the center

On 23 August, the French flotilla attacked the Chinese Fujian Fleet in the Battle of Fuzhou. D'Estaing, Villars, and the cruiser Duguay-Trouin engaged the Chinese cruisers Feiyun and Ji'an and the gunboat Zhenwei, along with a coastal artillery battery. At the start of the action, D'Estaing engaged Zhenwei while the other two French ships engaged Feiyun and Ji'an together. Zhenwei put up unexpectedly stiff resistance and she was only sunk by the combined firepower of all three French vessels after the other Chinese cruisers had been sunk. As Zhenwei burned furiously, her crew attempted to ram D'Estaing, but another salvo from Villars caused small arms ammunition aboard the Chinese vessel to explode and she quickly sank. The French ships then turned their attention to a shore battery that was neutralized shortly thereafter. Another group of French warships also quickly destroyed or captured other elements of the Fujian Fleet further inside the harbor; the entire action lasted a mere eight minutes. Most of the battle was fought at very close range, roughly two to three cables.

Over the night of 23–24 August, the Chinese sent several fire ships toward the French ships, forcing them to repeatedly shift position to evade them as they drifted down river. Courbet sought to destroy the arsenal facilities at Fuzhou and used his shallow-draft gunboats to bombard the fortifications around it on 24 August, and the next day, a 600-man landing party went ashore to complete the destruction of the facilities. Courbet then organized his fleet to leave the river, Triomphante in the lead, followed by Duguay-Trouin, Villars, and then D'Estaing, followed by the rest of the vessels. As the ships approached Couding near the mouth of the river, they needed to neutralize Chinese artillery batteries that blocked their exit. Triomphante and Duguay-Trouin engaged one set of batteries and drove off the gun crews. D'Estaing and Villars then sent a landing party ashore to destroy the guns. The French spent the night anchored off Couding and proceeded further downriver on 26 August; the forts at Mingan Pass were the next obstacle to reaching the open ocean. D'Estaing supported attacks by Triomphante and Duguay-Trouin, but her 138.6 mm guns were less useful than the 240 and 194 mm (7.6 in) guns of the larger vessels. She nevertheless covered landing parties that were sent ashore to destroy gun batteries.

These operations continued to 28 August, which again saw landing parties from D'Estaing and other vessels go ashore to destroy gun batteries blocking their progress downriver. By late on the 28th, the French had succeeded in destroying most of the coastal fortifications and; the next morning, Courbet took his ships down the last section of river and rendezvoused with La Galissonnière, which had been waiting to meet his ships since 25 August. D'Estaing and Villars immediately sailed for the Matsu Islands, while the larger vessels had to wait for high tide. The French victory at Fuzhou ended the initial diplomatic efforts to reach a compromise solution to the dispute over Tonkin, as the scale of the attack was such that the Chinese government could not ignore it.

==== Battle of Tamsui ====
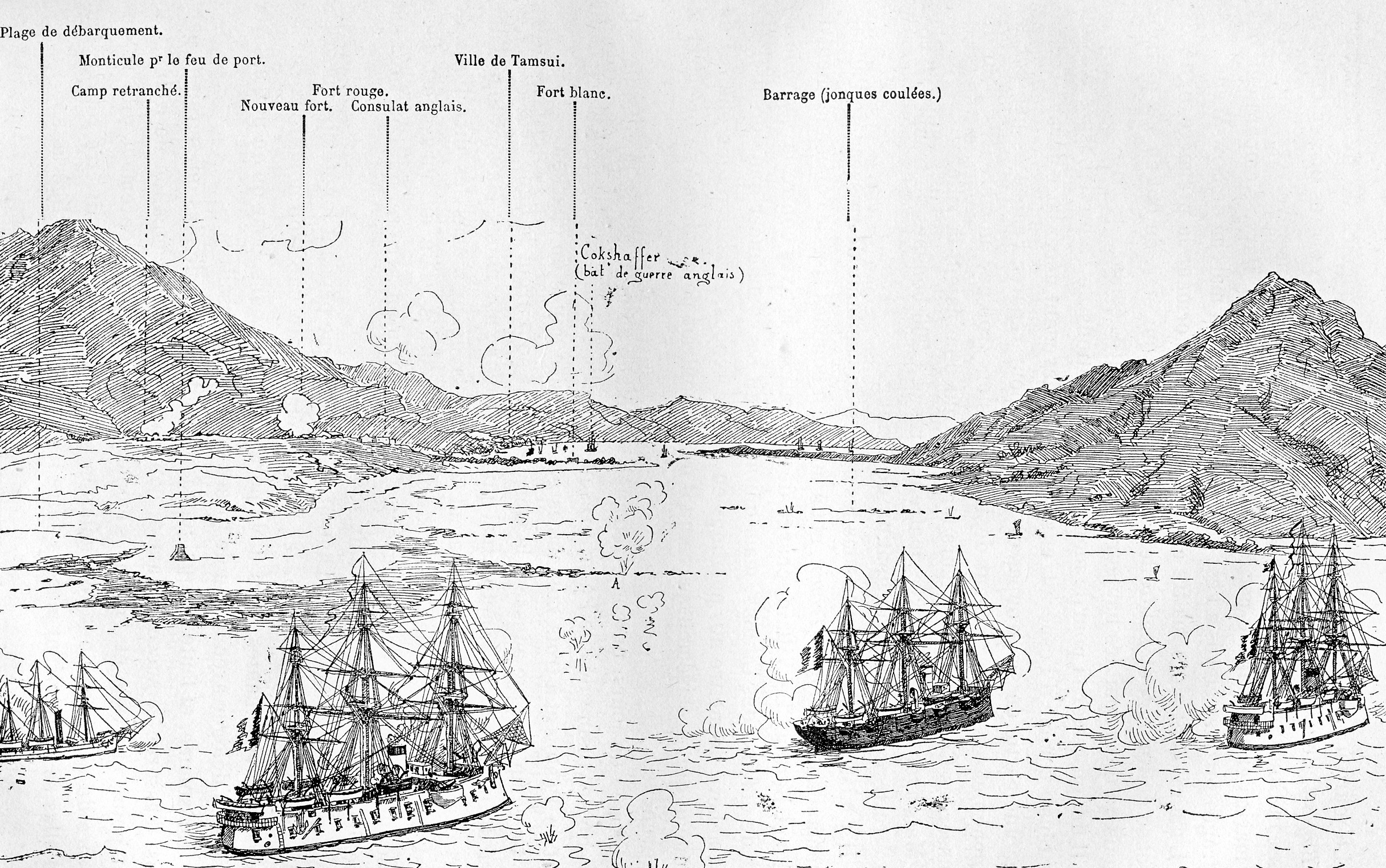
D'Estaing (painted black, center) at the Battle of Tamsui; Triomphante is astern and La Galissonnière is ahead

Courbet concentrated his squadron at Matsu, where the French spent September trying to decide what to do next. Three transport vessels carrying a total of 1,600 soldiers arrived on 29 September, by which time the French had decided to return to Keelung and try to conquer the port along with Tamsui. Courbet took several of his ships to resume the Keelung campaign, while his deputy, Rear Admiral Sébastien Lespès, took the remainder, centered on La Galissonnière, Triomphante, and D'Estaing, to attack Tamsui. They arrived off the city on 1 October, joining the gunboat Vipère, which had been blockading the city for a week.

The British gunboat HMS Cockchafer was trapped in the port when the Chinese defenders scuttled junks in the harbor mouth to block a French attack; when Lespès sent a warning to the British commander that he intended to attack on 2 October, the Chinese also observed the signal. Unlike at Fuzhou, when the French ships appeared on the morning of 2 October, the Chinese garrison did not wait for the French to fire first. The French ships, anchored about 2 to 3 nmi (3.7 to 5.6 km; 2.3 to 3.5 mi) from shore, quickly returned fire but their gun crews were blinded by a combination of the sunrise and fog close to shore. After a lengthy bombardment, the French eventually silenced the Chinese guns, but the stiffness of Chinese resistance convinced Lespès to delay the landing of ground troops until the next day.

The presence of a field of naval mines forced the French to clear it before sending men ashore, which further delayed the landing, along with bad weather. Finally, on 6 October, the landing party drawn from the squadron went ashore, but the French proceeded slowly and failed to attack aggressively, which permitted the Chinese defenders to pin down the French, call for reinforcements, and then use the additional forces to attack the French flanks. Threatened with encirclement, the French fled to their boats, but the Chinese were unable to exploit their victory owing to gunfire from Lespès' ships. The French suffered a total of 17 deaths and 49 wounded in the defeat, despite inflicting roughly four times as many casualties on the Chinese.

==== Blockade of Formosa and the Pescadores campaign ====
The French thereafter embarked on a blockade of Formosa on 20 October, while ground forces at Keelung waged a long battle with surrounding Chinese troops. D'Estaing joined the blockade, which extended well into 1885. On 2 November 1884, while cruising with Villars, D'Estaing stopped the Chinese gunboat Fei Hu. From 5 to 20 January 1885, D'Estaing cruised in company with Triomphante and the cruiser Champlain, and during this period, they stopped some thirty junks and captured two hundred Chinese sailors. D'Estaing remained on blockade duty in mid-February 1885 when Courbet took several of his ships to attack Chinese naval reinforcements at the Battle of Shipu. At that time, she was stationed on the northern end of the island in company with La Galissonnière, the ironclad Atalante, and the cruiser Volta. The blockade was not particularly effective, however, as the French lacked sufficient numbers of vessels to enforce it.

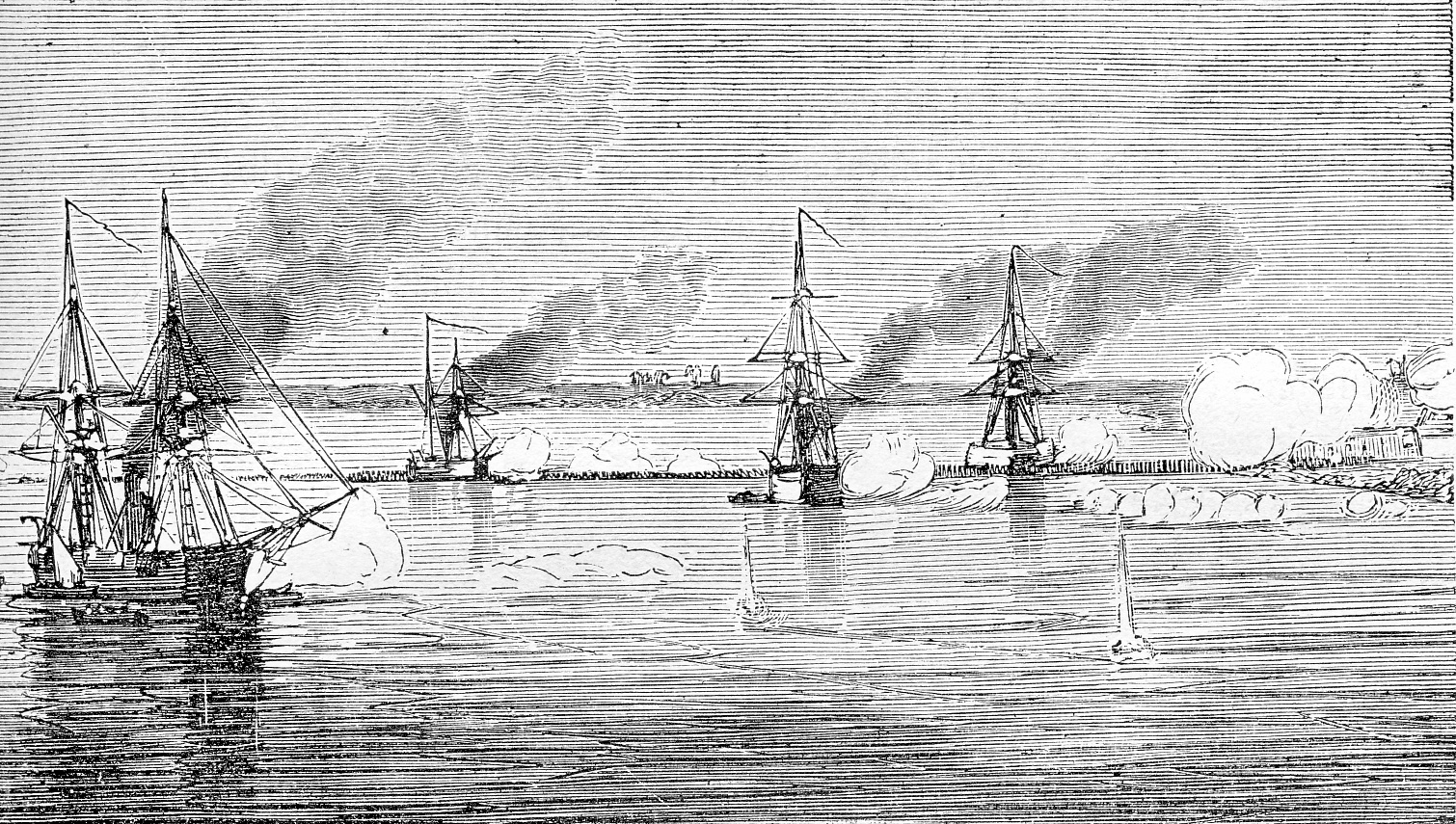
Courbet's ships bombarding Chinese positions in the Pescadores

In March, Courbet secured approval from Paris to launch an attack on the Pescadores islands, which would both serve as a better base of operations for the French fleet than Keelung, and also deny their use to Chinese vessels that were then seeking to break through the Formosa blockade. By 28 March, Courbet had assembled a flotilla that included D'Estaing, the ironclads Bayard and Triomphante, the cruiser Duchaffault, and the troopship Annamite, which was carrying some 400 soldiers taken from the Keelung garrison. They sortied in the early hours of 29 March arrived off the islands later that morning; D'Estaing and Duchaffault were assigned to bombard a coastal fortification on Plate Island. The Chinese garrison again opened fire first, but the French ships quickly neutralized the Chinese batteries within an hour of the beginning of the action. Demolition of the forts followed and Annamite sent the soldiers ashore on the southern end of the main island.

On 30 March, elements of the French squadron began to force their way into Makung harbor to support the marine landing party as it fought its way toward capturing the provincial capital there. The next day, D'Estaing, Bayard, and Triomphante contributed a landing party of around two hundred men to reinforce the marines on the island, bringing the total ashore to around 650. The French then launched a major attack on Makung's defenses and by the end of the day, had captured most of the fortifications and the city itself. Only one coastal fortification remained in Chinese hands, though it too fell on 1 April.

D'Estaing thereafter returned to blockade patrols off Formosa, and on 22 April, she stopped the troopship Pingon, which was carrying some 770 Chinese soldiers to Formosa. Secret negotiations between French and Chinese representatives had already begun, as both countries were losing patience with the costly war, and in late April, an agreement was reached that was formally signed on 9 June, ending the war. Following the end of the war, D'Estaing returned to France in company with the cruiser Kerguélen. The two cruisers towed several torpedo boats from Chinese waters to Saigon in southern Vietnam before continuing on for France.

=== Later career ===
D'Estaing had moved to the Indian Ocean station by 1887, serving along with the cruisers Dayot and Vaudreuil and the gunboats Chacal, Tirailleuse, and Redoute. She was still assigned to the Indian Ocean station by 1890, and by that time the unit had been expanded to the cruiser Hugon, the avisos Bouvet and Boursaint, and two other vessels. After returning home, D'Estaing was laid up at the Arsenal de Rochefort, where she underwent an overhaul and received new Indret boilers. She was temporarily commissioned in 1894 for sea trials after the work had been completed.

In 1898, D'Estaing cruised in the central Atlantic, and cruised in Cuban waters during the Spanish–American War. The ship passed through the American blockade of Havana, Cuba, on 8 July and remained there until 28 July, when she departed for Gibara, Cuba, arriving two days later; Spanish authorities had confined the French consul there to house arrest. D'Estaing was sent there to investigate the situation. The ship made another visit to Havana on 4 August, remaining in the port for ten days. After her sister Lapérouse was wrecked at Madagascar on 31 July, D'Estaing was transferred there to replace her as the flagship of the Indian Ocean division. She remained on the station through most of 1900, by which time she had been joined by her sister Nielly. On 23 November 1900, shortly after D'Estaing returned from Madagascar, she collided with the ironclad Amiral Baudin; both vessels were damaged in the accident. D'Estaing had been recalled so that she could be sold, and she was discarded shortly thereafter, being struck from the naval register on 2 May 1901 and sold to ship breakers on 20 August at Brest.
