= Lapérouse-class cruiser =

Group of cruisers built in the 19th century for the French Navy

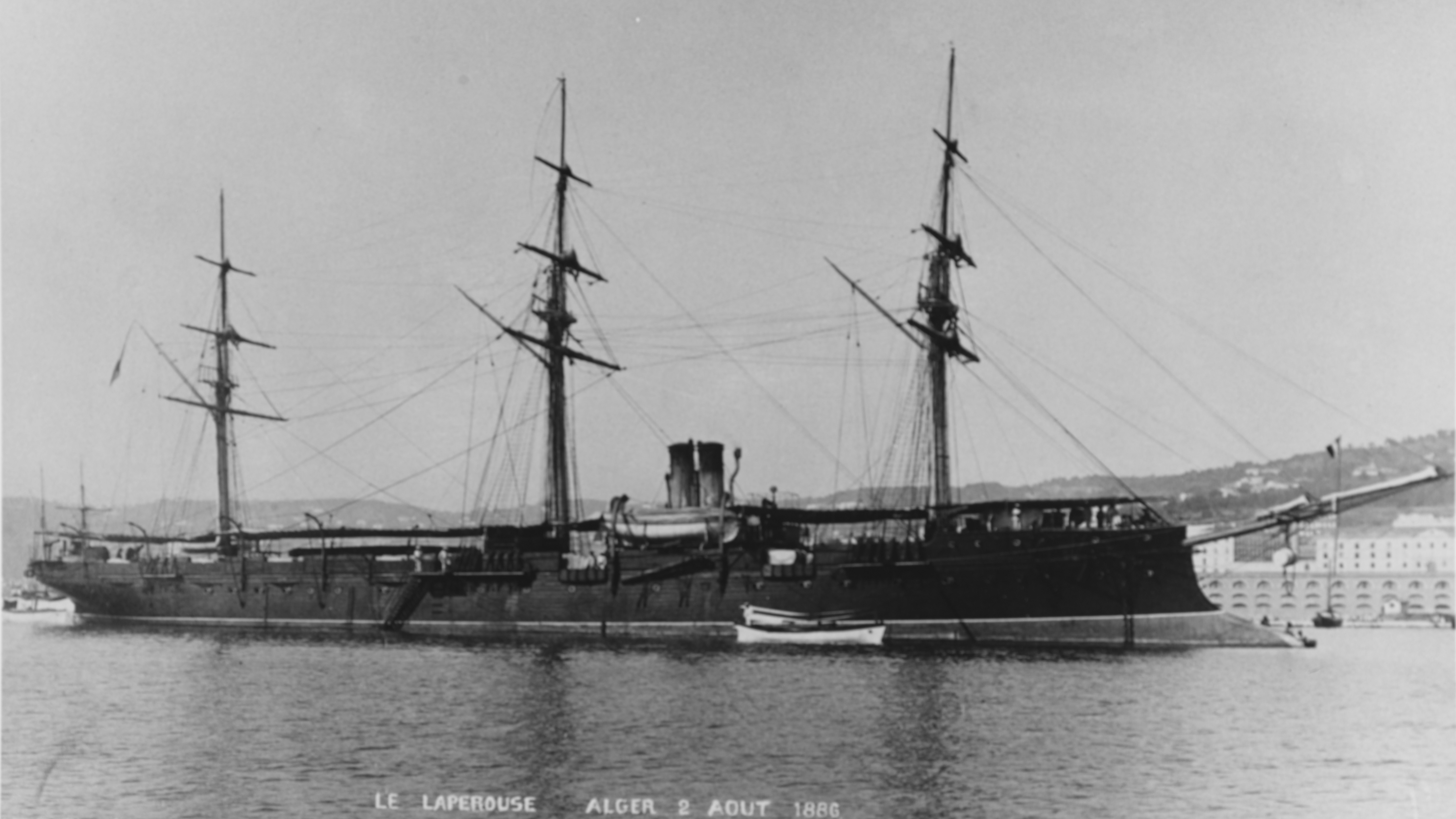
- Lapérouse at Algiers on 2 August 1886

Class overview
- Builders: Arsenal de Brest; Arsenal de Rochefort
- Operators: Marine Nationale
- Preceded by: Duguay-Trouin
- Succeeded by: Villars class
- Built: 1875–1883
- In service: 1879–1901
- Completed: 4
- Lost: 1
- Retired: 3

General characteristics
- Type: Unprotected cruiser
- Displacement: 2,320 t (2,280 long tons)
- Length: 79.5 m (260 ft 10 in) lwl
- Beam: 11.4 m (37 ft 5 in)
- Draft: 5.3 m (17 ft 5 in)
- Installed power: 6 × fire-tube boilers; 2,160 ihp (1,610 kW)
- Propulsion: 1 × compound steam engine; 1 × screw propeller
- Sail plan: Full ship rig
- Speed: 15 knots (28 km/h; 17 mph)
- Range: 4,980 nmi (9,220 km; 5,730 mi) at 10 knots (19 km/h; 12 mph)
- Complement: 264
- Armament: 15 × 138.6 mm (5.46 in) guns; 2 × 37 mm (1.5 in) Hotchkiss revolver cannon

The Lapérouse class was a group of four wooden-hulled unprotected cruisers of the French Navy built in the mid-1870s and early 1880s. The class comprised Lapérouse—the lead ship—D'Estaing, Nielly, and Primauguet. They were designed to operate overseas in the French colonial empire, and they were ordered as part of a construction program intended to strengthen the fleet after the French defeat in the Franco-Prussian War. They carried a main battery of fifteen 138.6 mm (5.46 in) guns, had a top speed of 15 knots (28 km/h; 17 mph), and had a full ship rig to supplement their steam engines during lengthy voyages abroad.

All four ships of the class were sent to East Asia during the Tonkin campaign, which led to the Sino-French War, in the mid-1880s. D'Estaing saw action at the Battle of Fuzhou, the Keelung campaign, the Battle of Tamsui, and the Pescadores campaign, while Nielly took part in the Battle of Shipu. Lapérouse participated in the blockade of Formosa, along with her other two sisters, but Primauguet arrived too late to take part in operations against Chinese forces. In 1895, Primauguet served as the flagship of the Indian Ocean division during the Second Madagascar expedition, which resulted in the conquest of Madagascar. Lapérouse was wrecked at Madagascar in 1898, and the three remaining members of the class were withdrawn from service in 1900–1901. Nielly and D'Estaing were broken up soon after being removed from service, but Primauguet remained in use as a hulk until 1907, when she too was sold for scrap.

== Design ==
Nielly, date unknown

In the aftermath of the French defeat in the Franco-Prussian War of 1870–1871, the French Navy was forced to drastically reduce naval spending and consolidate its forces. The Navy adopted a new construction plan in 1872, which envisioned a fleet for operations in home waters and one to patrol overseas to protect French interests abroad. The squadrons that were to support the French colonial empire were to consist of a small number of second class ironclad warships supported by a large number of wooden cruising vessels.

To provide new cruisers under the program, the French Minister of the Navy, Louis Raymond de Montaignac de Chauvance, forwarded a pair of designs to the Conseil des Travaux (Council of Works) on 8 March 1875. The minister had requested designs that strengthened the armament compared to earlier cruisers while keeping displacement similar, at the cost of speed. The two proposals, which the council reviewed on 28 May, were prepared by Victorin Sabattier and Arthur Bienaymé, the latter based on his earlier Infernet-class cruisers. They were similar vessels, armed with fifteen 138.6 mm (5.46 in) guns, all on the upper deck, forecastle, and sterncastle.

The council requested that six of the 138.6 mm guns be replaced with 164.7 mm (6.48 in) guns. They also suggested adding a short section of armor amidships around the funnel uptakes, reflecting the experience at the Battle of Havana, where the French aviso Bouvet was disabled by gunfire that damaged her funnel. Sabattier's design became the Villars class, while Bienaymé's proposal was chosen for the Lapérouse class, but neither of the council's recommendations were adopted. Bienaymé's hull lines were superior to Sabattier's design, resulting in greater speed for the Lapérouse class. Four ships were ordered to the design: Lapérouse, D'Estaing, Nielly, and Primauguet; Primauguet was initially named Monge, but was renamed during construction.

=== Characteristics ===
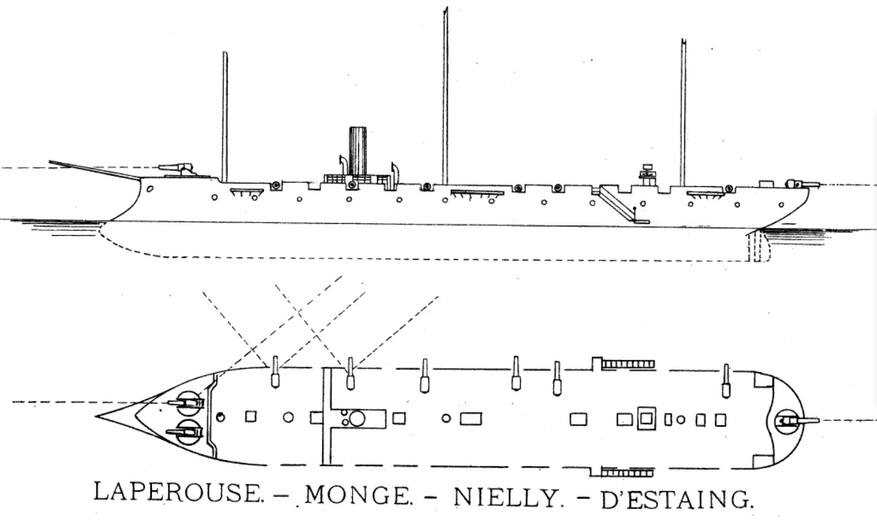
Plan and profile sketch of the Lapérouse class

The ships of the Lapérouse class were 79.5 m (260 ft 10 in) long at the waterline and 81.75 m (268 ft 3 in) long between perpendiculars. They had a beam of 11.4 m (37 ft 5 in) and an average draft of 5.3 m (17 ft 5 in) forward and 5.8 m (19 ft 0 in) aft. They displaced 2,320 t (2,280 long tons; 2,560 short tons) as designed. The ships had a pronounced ram bow, a short, open forecastle deck, and an overhanging stern. They were wooden-hulled, but used iron beams to strengthen their structure. In 1890, Lapérouse had her forecastle enclosed, and she received a short spar deck around her funnel that provided additional sheltered space. An enclosed shelter for her bridge was installed as well. Their crew amounted to 264 officers and enlisted men.

The ships' propulsion system consisted of a single horizontal compound steam engine driving a screw propeller. Steam was provided by six coal-burning fire-tube boilers; D'Estaing's were ducted into a single funnel, while the other three ships had a pair of closely spaced funnels place side-by-side and partially enclosed by a single outer casing. Their machinery was rated to produce 2,160 indicated horsepower (1,610 kW) for a top speed of 15 knots (28 km/h; 17 mph). All of the ships save D'Estaing carried 317 t (312 long tons; 349 short tons) of coal for their boilers; D'Estaing carried slightly less, at 315 t (310 long tons; 347 short tons). At a more economical speed of 10 knots (19 km/h; 12 mph), the ships could steam for 4,980 nautical miles (9,220 km; 5,730 mi), though D'Estaing could cruise for 4,800 nautical miles (8,900 km; 5,500 mi). They were fitted with a three-masted full-ship rig to supplement their steam engine on long voyages overseas.

The ships were armed with a main battery of fifteen 138.6 mm (5.46 in) M1870M 21.3-caliber guns. Two were placed atop the forecastle as chase guns, one was on the stern, and the remainder were placed in an amidships battery on the upper deck, six guns per broadside. The broadside guns were in pivot mounts firing through embrasures and were sponsoned out over the sides of the hull. A pair of 37 mm (1.5 in) Hotchkiss revolver cannon provided close-range defense against torpedo boats. The number of these guns was soon increased shortly after the ships were built; Lapérouse and D'Estaing received an additional six guns, Nielly received five, and Primauguet was brought to a total of ten guns. They also carried four 86.5 mm (3.41 in) bronze cannon that could be sent ashore with a landing party or used to arm the ship's boats. In 1892, Primauguet had her armament altered; the number of 138.6 mm guns was reduced to ten and a 65 mm (2.6 in) gun was installed. She retained the ten 37 mm guns.

== Ships ==
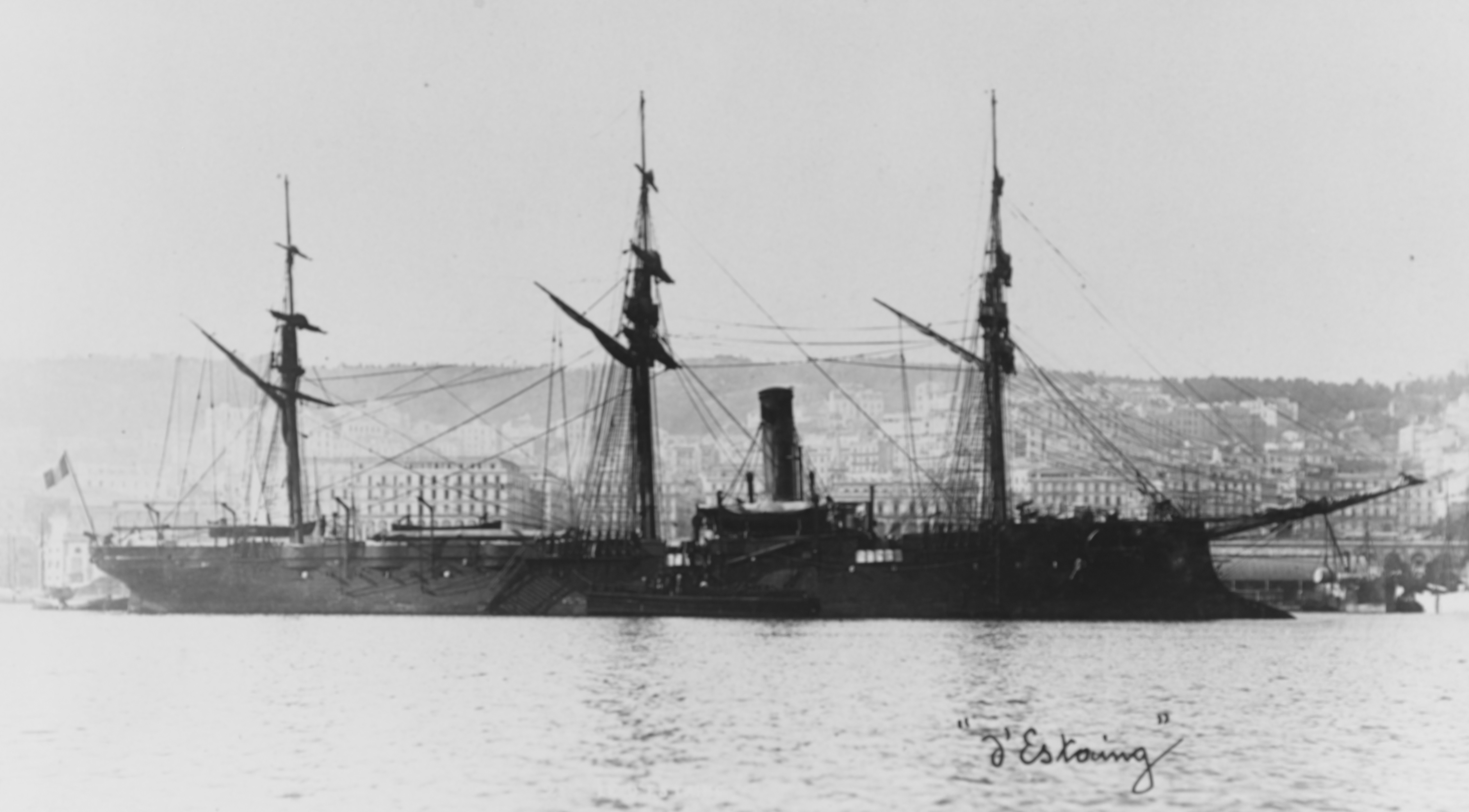
D'Estaing coaling in Algiers

Construction data
Name	Laid down	Launched	Completed	Shipyard
Lapérouse	23 June 1875	5 November 1877	6 October 1879	Arsenal de Brest, Brest
D'Estaing	4 August 1876	16 October 1879	1 September 1880	Arsenal de Brest, Brest
Nielly	16 August 1876	25 May 1880	1 January 1881	Arsenal de Brest, Cherbourg
Primauguet	10 January 1877	27 September 1882	1883	Arsenal de Rochefort, Rochefort

== Service history ==
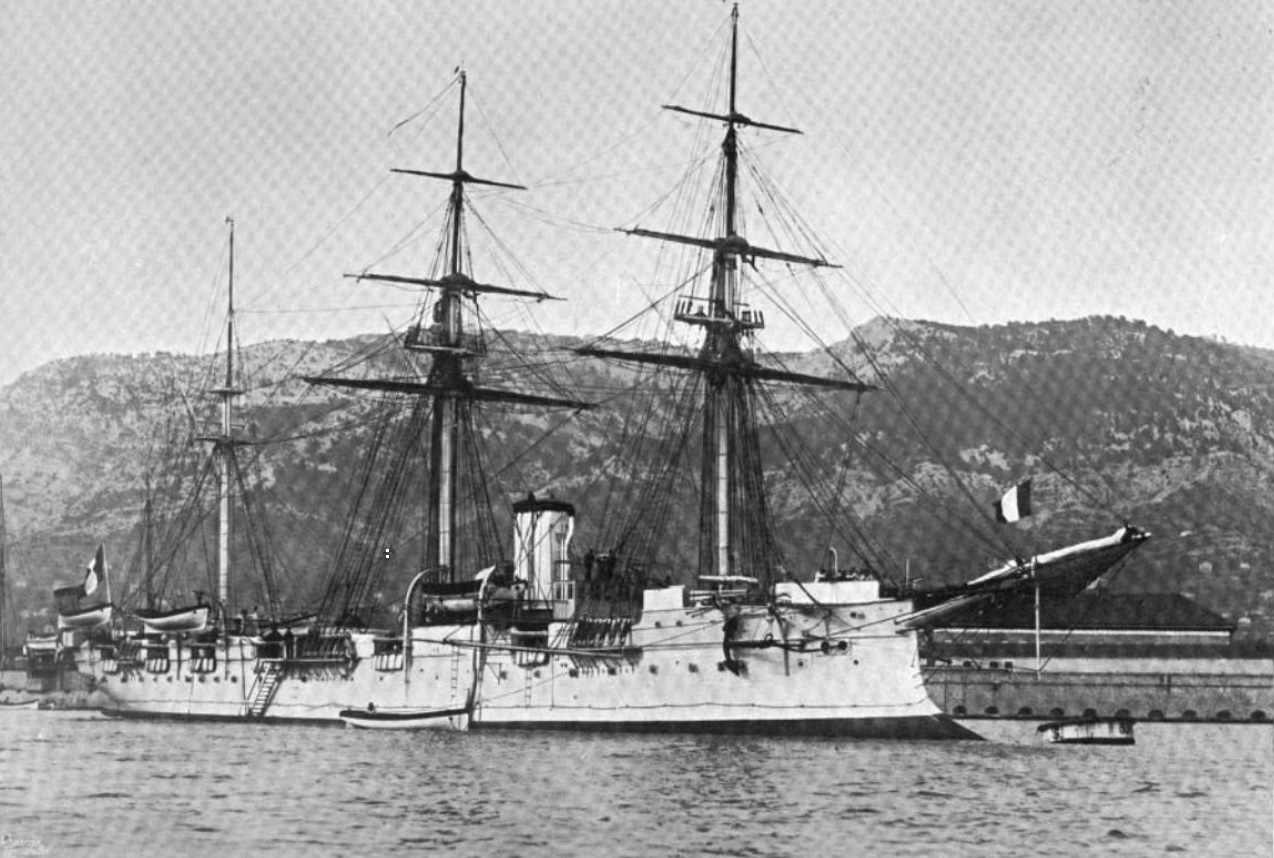
Lapérouse in port, date unknown

After completing construction in the early 1880s, all four members of the class were placed in the 2nd category of reserve. In 1883, D'Estaing was commissioned to join the Far East Squadron, commanded by Rear Admiral Amédée Courbet. As tensions with Qing China increased over the French Tonkin campaign to gain control of northern Vietnam, clashes between French and Chinese forces began, culminating in the landing at Keelung on Formosa. Shortly thereafter, Courbet took much of his squadron to Fuzhou, China, to attack the Fujian Fleet, though war had not been declared. D'Estaing was present for the Battle of Fuzhou, where she contributed to the sinking of three Chinese cruisers. The battle led to the start of the Sino-French War, and the French sent several warships to reinforce Courbet, including the other three Lapérouse-class cruisers. D'Estaing took part in the Battle of Tamsui and the subsequent blockade of Formosa, which Lapérouse and Nielly also joined. Nielly took part in the Battle of Shipu in January 1885 and D'Estaing participated in the Pescadores campaign in March. Primauguet arrived too late to see action during the war, which ended in April.

After the war, Lapérouse and Primauguet remained in East Asia, while Nielly was moved to the Indian Ocean division and D'Estaing returned to France. Primauguet served as the flagship of the Indian Ocean division at the start of the Second Madagascar expedition to conquer the island in 1895. In 1896, Lapérouse departed for the Indian Ocean division, where she relieved Primauguet as the flagship, the latter returning to France to be laid up. She was wrecked in Fort Dauphin, Madagascar, in July 1898. D'Estaing replaced her sister in the Indian Ocean division, and Nielly joined the unit in 1900. D'Estaing returned to France later that year and was struck from the naval register in May 1901, while Primauguet was struck earlier that year to be converted into a hulk. Nielly arrived in France also in May, and she was struck from the register in January 1901. Nielly and D'Estaing were quickly sold to ship breakers, but Primauguet lingered on as a hulk until 1907 when she too was sold for scrap.
