= French ship Atlas (1801) =

Ship of the line of the French Navy

History

Spain
- Name: Atlante
- Builder: Cartagena, Spain
- Launched: 21 December 1754
- Out of service: 22 September 1801 ship transferred to French Navy

France
- Name: Atlas
- Acquired: August 1801
- Commissioned: 23 September 1801
- Captured: 9 June 1808

Spain
- Name: Atlante
- Fate: Broken up in 1817

General characteristics
- Propulsion: Sail
- Armament: 74 guns

Atlante was a 74-gun ship of the line of the Spanish Navy. She was acquired by France in 1801 and commissioned in the French Navy, being renamed to Atlas in 1803, serving in Santo Domingo and taking part in the Battle of Cape Finisterre. She was captured in Vigo at the outbreak of the Peninsular War.

== Career ==
Atlante was built in Cartagena, Spain by expatriate English designer Edward Bryant, and launched in 1754. In August 1801, on the background of the War of the Second Coalition, Spain ceded her to her ally France. Atlante was brought into French service and commissioned in Cádiz on 23 September 1801.

In April 1802, she transferred to Toulon. On 20 June 1802, Captain Lavillesgris took command, and in August, she departed Toulon under to ferry troops to Santo Domingo, returning on 27 October. She performed another trip in January 1803, ferrying 750 soldiers and General Jean Sarrazin.

Atlante was renamed to Atlas on 4 February 1803. She took part in the Battle of Cape Finisterre under Captain Rolland, who sustained spectacular injuries when a powder reserve exploded near him.

Moored in Vigo as a hospital ship after the battle, she was captured there by the Spanish on 9 June 1808 after the outbreak of the Peninsular War.
