= Pierre-Nicolas de Rolland =

French Navy officer (1761–1825)

Pierre-Nicolas Rolland
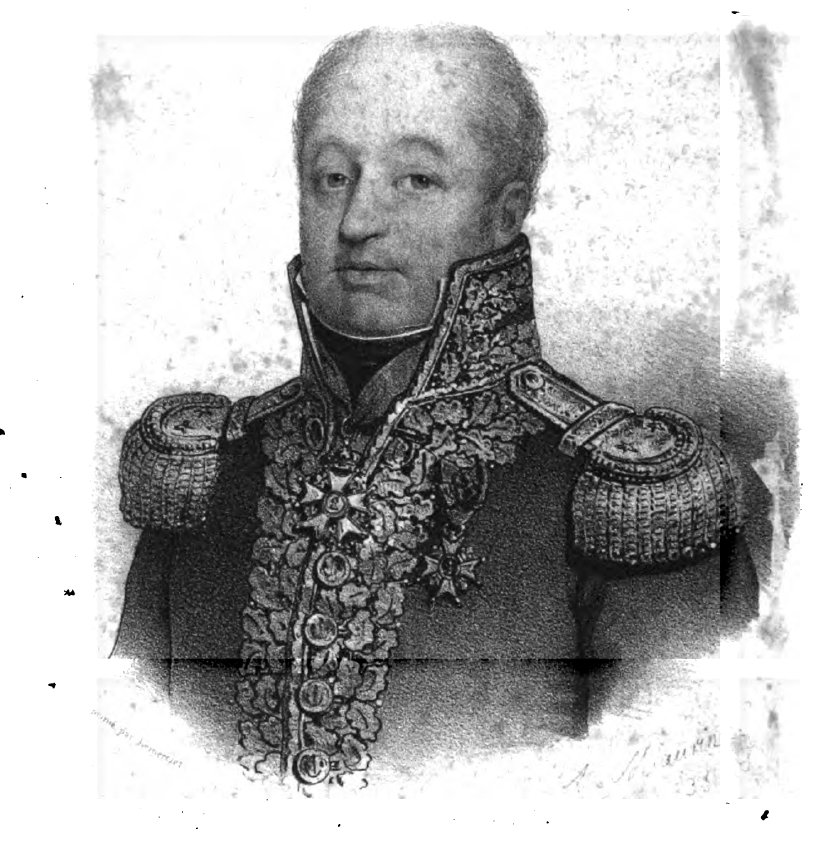
- Born: 29 April 1761; Dieppe, France
- Died: 9 November 1825 (aged 64)
- Military career
- Allegiance: France
- Rank: Contre-amiral
- Conflicts: American Revolutionary War; Battle of the Saintes; Napoleonic Wars; Battle of Cape Finisterre; Battle of the Basque Roads
- Awards: Commandeur of the Legion of Honour, Baron de l'Empire

Pierre-Nicolas, baron Rolland (French pronunciation: [pjɛʁ nikɔlɑ də ʁɔlɑ̃]; 29 April 1761 at Dieppe – 9 November 1825), was a French admiral noted for his participation at the battles of Cape Finisterre in 1805 and the Basque Roads in 1809 during the Napoleonic Wars.

== Life ==
Rolland joined the French Navy at a young age, participating in the American War of Independence, on board Sibylle in 1778 in the squadron of Louis Guillouet d'Orvilliers, the Amphion in 1779, in the squadron of d'Estaing, the Amphitrite between 1779 and 1781, and the Emeraude in 1782, in which he was wounded at the Battle of the Saintes.

An auxiliary officer in 1782, as a lieutenant, Rolland was promoted captain en 1796 and was in command of 74-gun ship of the line Atlas with Villeneuve's fleet in 1805, fighting at the Battle of Cape Finisterre in which he was badly wounded. In 1809 he was flag captain to Zacharie Allemand on Océan during the Battle of Basque Roads, in which his ship was badly damaged and nearly destroyed.

Rolland was promoted Contre-amiral in 1814, after being distinguished by his command of Romulus at the action of 13 February 1814 off Toulon, under the orders of Julien Marie Cosmao-Kerjulien. He was honoured as a commander of the Legion d'Honneur and made a Baron de l'Empire.

== Bibliography ==
- Théodore-Éloi Lebreton, Biographie normande: recueil de notices biographiques et bibliographiques sur les personnages célèbres nés en Normandie et sur ceux qui se sont seulement distingués par leurs actions ou par leurs écrits, 1861
- Christian de La Jonquière, Les Marins français sous Louis XVI: guerre d'indépendance américaine, 1996
- P. Lerot, Les gloires maritimes de la France: notices biographiques sur les plus célèbres marins, 1866
- Joseph François Gabriel Hennequin, Biographie maritime ou notices historiques sur la vie et les campagnes des marins célèbres français et étrangers, Volume 1, 1835
