= French cruiser Villars =

French naval vessel of the 1880s

- Villars' sister ship Forfait, date unknown

History

France
- Name: Villars
- Builder: Arsenal de Cherbourg
- Laid down: 9 July 1875
- Launched: 21 August 1879
- Commissioned: 1881
- In service: 20 January 1882
- Stricken: 8 July 1896
- Fate: Sold for scrap, 17 December 1896

General characteristics
- Class & type: Villars-class cruiser
- Displacement: 2,419 t (2,381 long tons)
- Length: 74.27 m (243 ft 8 in) lwl
- Beam: 11.6 m (38 ft 1 in)
- Draft: 5.31 m (17 ft 5 in)
- Installed power: 6 × fire-tube boilers; 2,700 ihp (2,000 kW)
- Propulsion: 1 × compound steam engine; 1 × screw propeller
- Sail plan: Full ship rig
- Speed: 14.6 knots (27.0 km/h; 16.8 mph)
- Range: 4,810 nmi (8,910 km; 5,540 mi) at 10 knots (19 km/h; 12 mph)
- Complement: 269
- Armament: 15 × 138.6 mm (5.46 in) guns; 2 × 37 mm (1.5 in) Hotchkiss revolver cannon

Villars was the lead ship of the Villars class of unprotected cruisers built for the French Navy in the 1870s. The ships were designed for service in the French colonial empire, and they carried a relatively heavy battery of fifteen 138.6 mm (5.46 in) guns, and could steam at a speed of 14.5 knots (26.9 km/h; 16.7 mph). Villars was laid down in 1875 and was completed in 1881. She saw significant service in East Asia in the early to mid-1880s during France's campaign to secure a colony in Tonkin (now Vietnam) and the Sino-French War that began as a direct result of France's interference in what Qing China viewed as a traditional subordinate country. During the latter conflict, she saw action at the Battle of Fuzhou, where she assisted in the destruction of two Chinese cruisers and a gunboat, and later participated in the blockade of Formosa. The rest of the ship's career passed relatively uneventfully, and in 1896, she was struck from the naval register and thereafter sold for scrap.

== Design ==
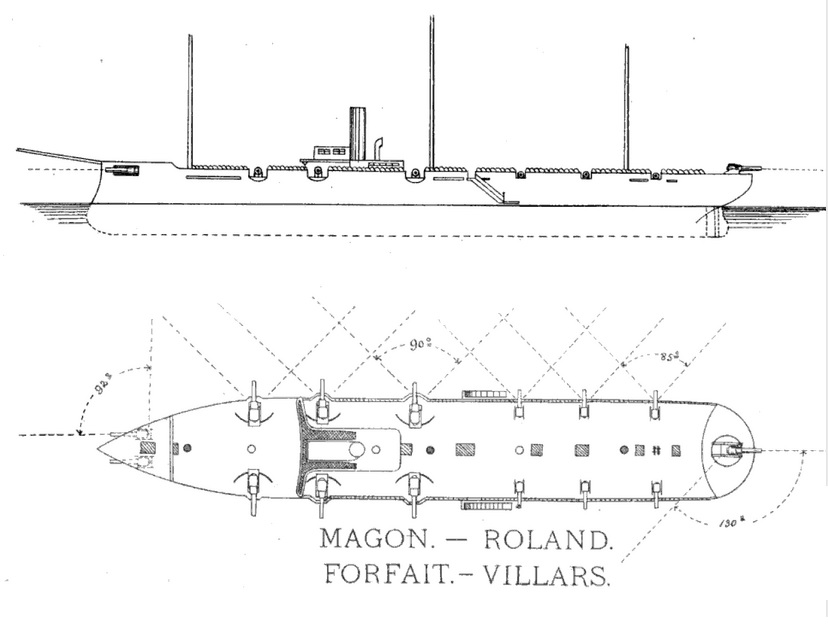
Plan and profile view of the Villars class

The four ships of the Villars class were ordered under the auspices of the naval plan of 1872, which was laid out to modernize the French Navy in the aftermath of the Franco-Prussian War of 1870–1871. The navy sought new unprotected cruisers that carried a heavier armament than earlier vessels, while maintaining a similar size to keep costs from increasing during a period of limited naval budgets. The design for the ships was drawn up by the naval engineer Victorin Sabattier. The vessels were intended to serve overseas in the French colonial empire.

Villars was 74.27 m (243 ft 8 in) long at the waterline, with a beam of 11.6 m (38 ft 1 in) and an average draft of 5.31 m (17 ft 5 in). She displaced 2,419 t (2,381 long tons; 2,666 short tons) as designed. The ship had a ram bow and an overhanging stern. Her crew amounted to 269 officers and enlisted men. The ship's propulsion system consisted of a single compound steam engine driving a screw propeller. Steam was provided by six coal-burning fire-tube boilers that were ducted into a single funnel. Her machinery was rated to produce 2,700 indicated horsepower (2,000 kW) for a top speed of 14.6 knots (27.0 km/h; 16.8 mph). At a more economical speed of 10 knots (19 km/h; 12 mph), the ship could steam for 4,810 nautical miles (8,910 km; 5,540 mi).

The ship was armed with a main battery of fifteen 138.6 mm (5.46 in) M1870M 21.3-caliber guns. Two were placed in the forecastle, firing through embrasures as chase guns, one was atop the stern, and the remainder were placed in an amidships battery on the upper deck, six guns per broadside. Of the broadside guns, the forward three on each side were placed in sponsons, while the remaining three guns were in pivot mounts firing through embrasures. A pair of 37 mm (1.5 in) Hotchkiss revolver cannon provided close-range defense against torpedo boats. Villars also carried a pair of 86.5 mm (3.41 in) bronze mountain guns or a single 65 mm (2.6 in) field gun that could be sent ashore with a landing party.

== Service history ==
Villars was laid down at the Arsenal de Cherbourg (Cherbourg Naval Base) on 9 July 1875, and she was launched on 21 August 1879. She was commissioned to begin sea trials in 1881, including full power testing carried out on 10 June. Her testing was completed in early July that year, and on 10 July, she was reduced to the 2nd category of reserve. She was recommissioned on 20 January 1882 for a deployment to what was to become French Indochina in East Asia. At that time, French naval forces in the area also included the ironclad Victorieuse, the unprotected cruisers Volta and Kersaint, and the gunboat Lutin, and the unit was commanded by Rear Admiral Charles Meyer. Tensions in the region had risen considerably, particularly after the Battle of Hanoi in April, since China traditionally viewed Tonkin as part of its own sphere of influence. As a result, significant reinforcements under Rear Admiral Amédée Courbet were dispatched in early 1883 to strengthen French naval forces in the area as the Tonkin campaign got underway. With the arrival of Courbet's reinforcements, the unit was re-designated the Far East Squadron. In April, Villars contributed a landing party to reinforce the unit commanded by capitaine de vaisseau (ship-of-the-line captain) Henri Rivière at Hanoi. The men were later involved in the Battle of Paper Bridge in May.

=== Sino-French War ===
France's campaign to occupy Vietnam, a traditional subject of Qing China, led to clashes between French and Chinese forces, and ultimately, to the start of the Sino-French War in 1884. In late July, Villars was sent to Keelung, China, on the island of Formosa to initiate a blockade of the port. On 4 August, reinforcements arrived and Villars anchored in a position to prepare for a bombardment of the coastal fort protecting the harbor. The French issued an ultimatum that evening demanding that the garrison surrender, which the Chinese refused. At about 08:00 the next morning, Villars and several other French warships, including the ironclad La Galissonnière, opened fire, starting the Keelung campaign. After about 45 minutes of shooting, Villars and the gunboat Lutin forced the gunners at two outer forts to abandon their guns, and by 09:00, the Chinese had stopped firing. Villars sent a landing party of 80 men ashore to capture the forts, and after Chinese soldiers began to mass for a counter-attack, La Galissonnière sent a party of her own to reinforce Villars' detachment. The ships also provided fire support, which disrupted the Chinese attack. On 6 August, the French forces ashore, which by now numbered around 200 men, attempted to capture Keelung itself. They quickly found themselves to be significantly outnumbered by some 2,000 Chinese soldiers, so the French fell back to the fortifications, destroyed the guns there, and then withdrew to their ships. Villars sailed south to Fuzhou to inform Courbet of the situation at Keelung. On the way, Villars seized the German steamer SS Welle, which had been carrying Chinese soldiers to Keelung. The German consul in Hong Kong protested the action as illegal.

==== Battle of Fuzhou ====
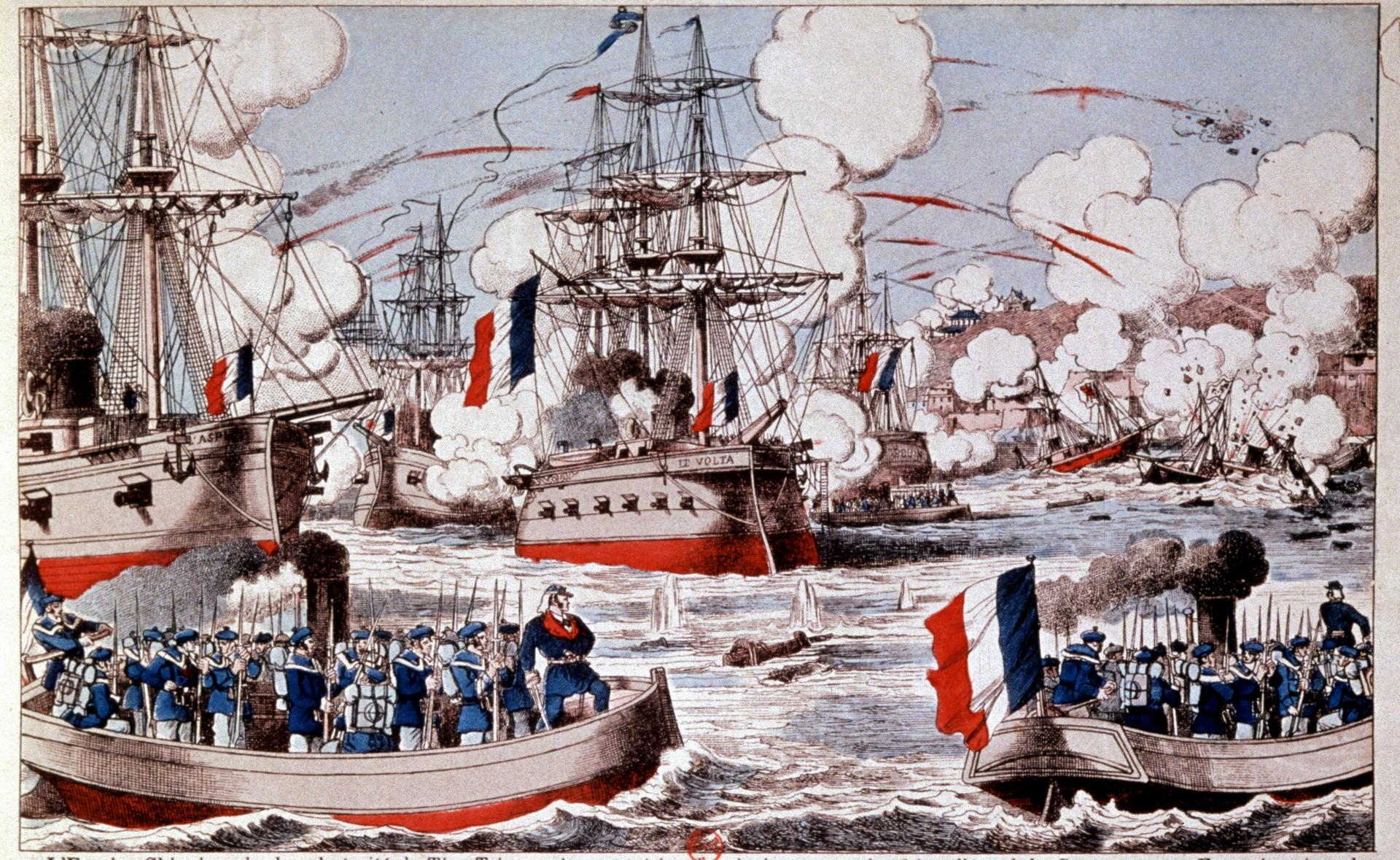
Illustration of the French squadron attacking the Fujian Fleet at the Battle of Fuzhou

Villars arrived at Fuzhou on 15 August, followed the next day by the cruiser D'Estaing, and thereafter by the ironclad Triomphante. On 23 August, the French flotilla attacked the Chinese Fujian Fleet in the Battle of Fuzhou. Villars, D'Estaing, and the cruiser Duguay-Trouin engaged the Chinese cruisers Feiyun and Ji'an and the gunboat Zhenwei, along with a coastal artillery battery. At the start of the action, Villars engaged Feiyun and Ji'an in company with Duguay-Trouin; the Chinese cruisers were quickly sunk under French gunfire. Villars then engaged the shore battery and assisted D'Estaing with the destruction of Zhenwei, which put up unexpectedly heavy resistance until Triomphante joined the action and smashed the small gunboat with her 240 mm (9.4 in) guns. The shore battery was neutralized shortly thereafter. Another group of French warships also quickly destroyed or captured other elements of the Fujian Fleet further inside the harbor; the entire action lasted a mere eight minutes. Most of the battle was fought at very close range, roughly two to three cables.

Over the night of 23–24 August, the Chinese sent several fire ships toward the French ships, forcing them to repeatedly shift position to evade them as they drifted down river. Courbet sought to destroy the arsenal facilities at Fuzhou and used his shallow-draft gunboats to bombard the fortifications around it on 24 August, and the next day, a 600-man landing party went ashore to complete the destruction of the facilities. Courbet then organized his fleet to leave the river, Triomphante in the lead, followed by Duguay-Trouin, then Villars, followed by the rest of the vessels. As the ships approached Couding near the mouth of the river, they needed to neutralize Chinese artillery batteries that blocked their exit. Triomphante and Duguay-Trouin engaged one set of batteries and drove off the gun crews. Villars then sent a landing party ashore to destroy the guns. The French spent the night anchored off Couding and proceeded further downriver on 26 August; the forts at Mingan Pass were the next obstacle to reaching the open ocean. Villars supported attacks by Triomphante and Duguay-Trouin, but her 138.6 mm guns were less useful than the 240 and 194 mm (7.6 in) guns of the larger vessels. She nevertheless covered landing parties that were sent ashore to destroy gun batteries.

These operations continued to 28 August, which again saw landing parties from Villars and other vessels go ashore to destroy gun batteries blocking their progress downriver. By late on the 28th, the French had succeeded in destroying most of the coastal fortifications and; the next morning, Courbet took his ships down the last section of river and rendezvoused with La Galissonnière, which had been waiting to meet his ships since 25 August. Villars and D'Estaing immediately sailed for the Matsu Islands, while the larger vessels had to wait for high tide. The French victory at Fuzhou ended the initial diplomatic efforts to reach a compromise solution to the dispute over Tonkin, as the scale of the attack was such that the Chinese government could not ignore it.

==== Operations off Formosa ====
Courbet concentrated his squadron at Matsu, where the French spent September trying to decide what to do next. Three transport vessels carrying a total of 1,600 soldiers arrived on 29 September, by which time the French had decided to return to Keelung and try to conquer the port along with Tamsui. Villars did not participate in either operation; the former succeeded but the latter was repulsed by the Chinese garrison. The French thereafter embarked on a blockade of Formosa on 20 October, while ground forces at Keelung waged a long battle with surrounding Chinese troops. Villars joined the blockade, which extended well into 1885. On 2 November 1884, while cruising with D'Estaing, Villars stopped the Chinese gunboat Fei Hu. The blockade was not particularly effective, however, as the French lacked sufficient numbers of vessels to enforce it. Villars remained on blockade duty in mid-February 1885 when Courbet took several of his ships to attack Chinese naval reinforcements at the Battle of Shipu. Villars was at that time stationed at Tainan on Formosa. Secret negotiations between French and Chinese representatives had already begun, as both countries were losing patience with the costly war, and in April, an agreement was reached that was formally signed on 9 June, ending the war.

=== Later career ===
By early 1887, Villars had returned to France. She participated in the annual fleet maneuvers with the Mediterranean Squadron that year, which took place in April and May. The assembled fleet included nine ironclads, the new protected cruiser Sfax, and the unprotected cruisers Milan, Seignelay, Desaix and Dupetit-Thouars, the torpedo cruiser Condor, and several smaller vessels. The exercises were organized to test the practicality of using small torpedo boats to intercept a convoy in the open Mediterranean Sea, but the small craft proved to be incapable of operating far from shore. Villars suffered machinery problems during these maneuvers and was unable to take part in a second series of exercises held in late July and early August.

In 1890, Villars was sent on another deployment to East Asia. The following year, the unit also included the ironclad Triomphante, the aviso Inconsiant, and the gunboats Lion and Vipére. By June 1894, Villars had been assigned to the Atlantic Division, along with the unprotected cruisers Duquesne and Beautemps-Beaupré and the aviso Hussard. Villars was struck from the naval register on 8 July 1896, and was sold on 17 December to be broken up.
