= Villars-class cruiser =

French class of warships of the 1880s

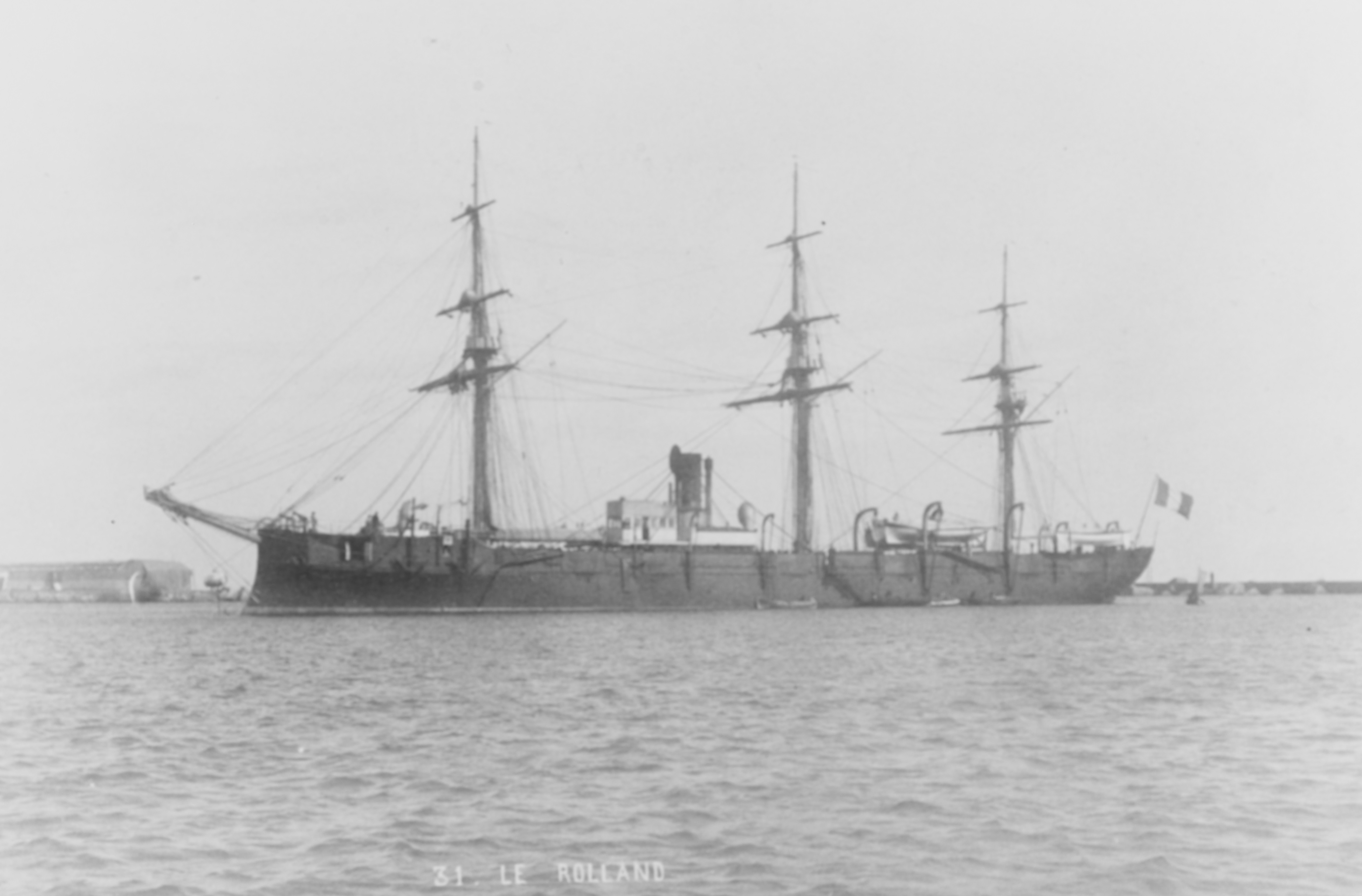
- Roland

Class overview
- Operators: French Navy
- Preceded by: Lapérouse class
- Succeeded by: Iphigénie
- Completed: 4

General characteristics
- Type: Unprotected cruiser
- Displacement: 2,419 t (2,381 long tons)
- Length: 74.27 m (243 ft 8 in) lwl
- Beam: 11.6 m (38 ft 1 in)
- Draft: 5.31 m (17 ft 5 in)
- Installed power: 6 × fire-tube boilers; 2,700 ihp (2,000 kW)
- Propulsion: 1 × compound steam engine; 1 × screw propeller
- Sail plan: Full ship rig
- Speed: 14.6 knots (27.0 km/h; 16.8 mph)
- Range: 4,800 to 4,810 nmi (8,890 to 8,910 km; 5,520 to 5,540 mi) at 10 knots (19 km/h; 12 mph)
- Complement: 269
- Armament: 15 × 138.6 mm (5.46 in) guns; 2 × 37 mm (1.5 in) Hotchkiss revolver cannon

The Villars class of unprotected cruisers was a group of four ships built for the French Navy in the mid-1870s and early 1880s. The class comprised Villars, Forfait, Magon, and Roland. They were designed as part of a naval construction program aimed at modernizing the French fleet in the aftermath of the Franco-Prussian War, and were intended to serve overseas in the French colonial empire. As such, they were fitted with a full-ship rig to allow them to cruise for extended periods of time without burning coal for their steam engine, and they carried a relatively heavy armament of fifteen 138.6 mm (5.46 in) guns.

Villars and Forfait were both involved in attempts to expand the French empire in the mid-1880s, in Southeast Asia and Madagascar, respectively. Villars saw action during the Sino-French War that resulted from France's actions in Asia; she took part in the Keelung campaign, the Battle of Fuzhou, and the blockade of Formosa during the war. Forfait participated in the First Madagascar expedition that failed to seize control of the island. Roland and Magon were both sent to reinforce French forces during the Sino-French War, but the conflict had ended by the time they arrived. The ships served for another decade, frequently with the North Atlantic Squadron, and by the late 1890s, all four had been removed from active service. Villars, Roland, and Magon were quickly scrapped. Only Forfait survived into the 1900s, being used as a storage hulk until she was broken up in 1920.

== Design ==
Forfait in port, date unknown

In the aftermath of the French defeat in the Franco-Prussian War of 1870–1871, the French Navy was forced to drastically reduce naval spending and consolidate its forces. The Navy adopted a new construction plan in 1872, which envisioned a fleet for operations in home waters and one to patrol overseas to protect French interests abroad. The squadrons that were to support the French colonial empire were to consist of a small number of second class ironclad warships supported by a large number of wooden cruising vessels. To provide new cruisers under the program, the French Minister of the Navy, Louis Raymond de Montaignac de Chauvance, forwarded a pair of designs to the Conseil des Travaux (Council of Works) on 8 March 1875. The minister had requested designs that strengthened the armament compared to earlier cruisers while keeping displacement similar, at the cost of speed.

The two proposals, which the council reviewed on 28 May, were prepared by Victorin Sabattier and Arthur Bienaymé. They were similar vessels, armed with fifteen 138.6 mm (5.46 in) guns, all on the upper deck, forecastle, and sterncastle. The council requested that six of these guns be replaced with 164.7 mm (6.48 in) guns. They also suggested adding a short section of armor amidships around the funnel uptakes, reflecting the experience at the Battle of Havana, where the French aviso Bouvet was disabled by gunfire that damaged her funnel. Sabattier's design was chosen, but neither of the council's recommendations were adopted. One alteration was made, however, which was to move the forecastle guns a deck lower, firing through embrasures.

=== Characteristics ===
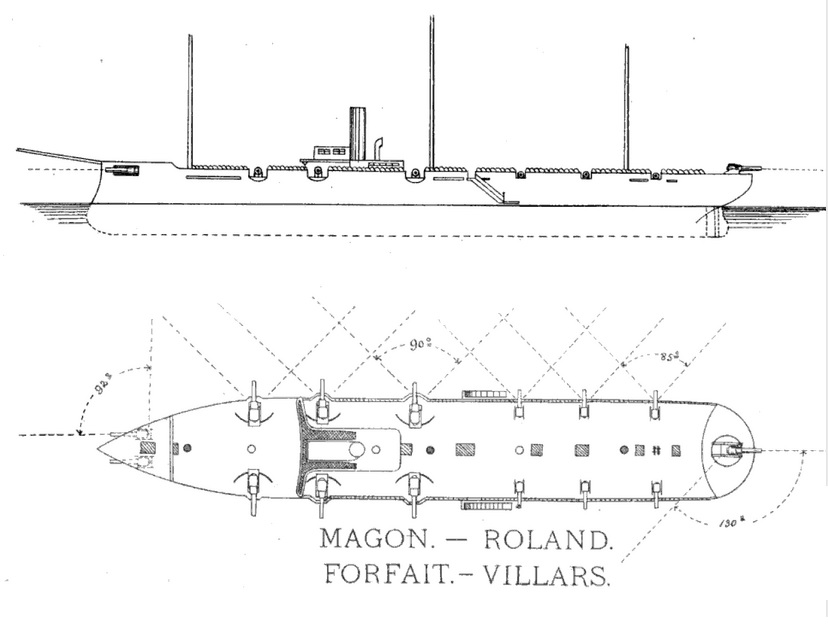
Plan and profile view of the Villars class

Villars, Magon, and Roland were 74.27 m (243 ft 8 in) long at the waterline and 76.27 m (250 ft 3 in) long between perpendiculars, with a beam of 11.6 m (38 ft 1 in) and an average draft of 5.31 m (17 ft 5 in). They displaced 2,419 t (2,381 long tons). Forfait differed slightly from her sisters, being 74.18 m (243 ft 4 in) at the waterline and 76.16 m (249 ft 10 in) between perpendiculars. Her beam was 11.62 m (38 ft 1 in) and her draft was 5.13 m (16 ft 10 in) on 2,321 t (2,284 long tons) displacement. Their hulls were constructed with wood, with iron cross beams to support the structure. They had an inverted bow with a ram and an overhanging stern. They had a short forecastle, and their superstructure consisted of a small conning tower placed just forward of amidships. The ship had no armor protection, but the ships did have a partial double bottom. Their standard crew consisted of 269 officers and enlisted men, with the exception of Forfait, the crew of which numbered 264.

All four ships were propelled by a single horizontal, 3-cylinder compound steam engine that drove a screw propeller. Steam was provided by six coal-burning fire-tube boilers that were ducted into a single funnel located amidships. The power plant was rated to produce 2,700 indicated horsepower (2,000 kW) using forced draft, but during her initial speed testing, Villars reached 2,943 ihp (2,195 kW) for a top speed of 14.6 knots (27.0 km/h; 16.8 mph). Forfait's propulsion system was rated for 2,160 ihp (1,610 kW) at normal draft but reached 2,960 ihp (2,210 kW) for a speed of 14.7 knots (27.2 km/h; 16.9 mph). The ships carried 330 to 334 t (325 to 329 long tons) of coal, and at a cruising speed of 10 knots (19 km/h; 12 mph), they could steam for 4,800 to 4,810 nautical miles (8,890 to 8,910 km; 5,520 to 5,540 mi). To supplement their steam engines, they were fitted with a three-masted full ship rig.

The ships were armed with a main battery of fifteen 138.6 mm (5.46 in) M1870M 21.3-caliber guns. Two were placed in the forecastle as chase guns, one was atop the stern, and the remainder were placed in an amidships battery on the upper deck, six guns per broadside. Of the broadside guns, the forward three on each side were placed in sponsons, while the remaining three guns were in pivot mounts firing through embrasures. A pair of 37 mm (1.5 in) Hotchkiss revolver cannon provided close-range defense against torpedo boats. They also carried a pair of 86.5 mm (3.41 in) bronze mountain guns or a single 65 mm (2.6 in) field gun that could be sent ashore with a landing party.

== Ships ==
Forfait anchored offshore

Construction data
Name	Laid down	Launched	Completed	Shipyard
Villars	9 July 1875	21 August 1879	July 1881	Arsenal de Cherbourg, Cherbourg
Forfait	2 November 1876	6 February 1879	April 1880	Société Nouvelle des Forges et Chantiers de la Méditerranée, La Seyne-sur-Mer
Magon	18 April 1876	9 August 1880	September 1882	Arsenal de Cherbourg, Cherbourg
Roland	2 July 1877	14 October 1882	August 1884	Arsenal de Cherbourg, Cherbourg
N	—	—	—	—

== Service history ==
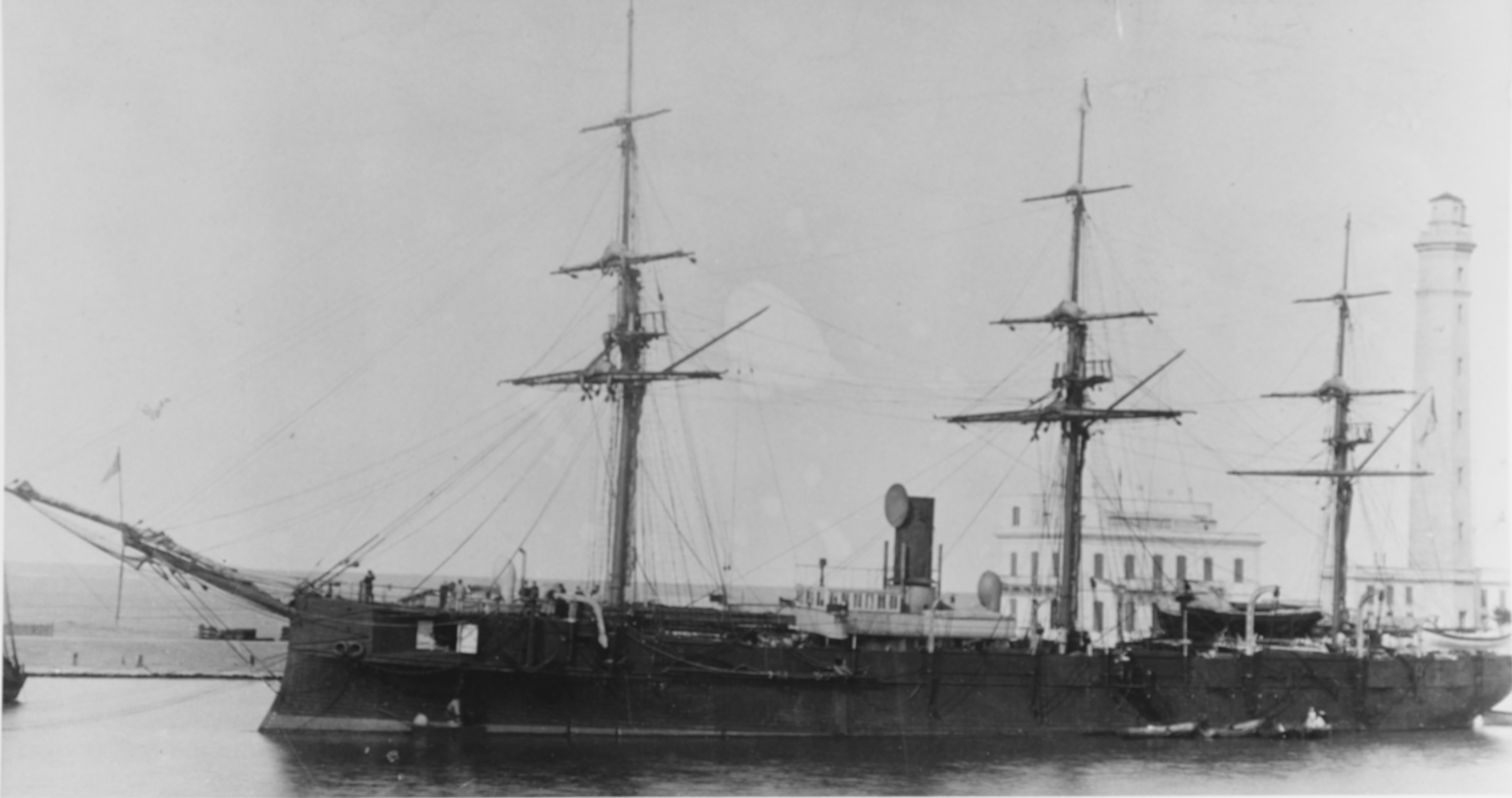
Magon in port

Villars was sent to East Asia in 1882 as French forces continued their encroachment into Vietnam; further French reinforcements were sent after the Tonkin campaign began in 1883. France's attempts to subjugate northern Vietnam brought the French into conflict with China, which viewed the Vietnamese as being within the Chinese sphere of influence. In July, Villars was sent to blockade the port of Keelung on the island of Formosa, which led to the Keelung campaign, the first major battle of the Sino-French War. During the battle, Villars bombarded Chinese positions and sent a landing party ashore. With the start of a larger war, France activated Roland and Magon to further strengthen French naval forces. In the meantime, Villars next moved to Fuzhou on mainland China with much of the rest of the French fleet, where they attacked the Chinese Fujian Fleet at the Battle of Fuzhou. Villars helped to sink three Chinese cruisers, and then during the lengthy operation to fight their way down the Min River, she assisted with the destruction of numerous Chinese coastal artillery batteries. She then took part in a blockade of Formosa that lasted until April 1885, when the war ended. Roland, Magon, and the other reinforcements that had been dispatched in early 1885 arrived too late to see action during the conflict.

At the same time that Villars was fighting in East Asia, Forfait was engaged in another attempt to enlarge the French colonial empire. Having been sent to the Indian Ocean in 1881, Forfait joined several other cruisers to launch the First Madagascar expedition, an effort to conquer the island of Madagascar off the eastern coast of Africa. The operations began with an attack on the port of Tamatave in May 1883, where Forfait bombarded the town and contributed men to a landing party that seized the area. Forfait later helped to defend the city of Mahajanga, where the pro-French Sakalava were fighting government forces. Fighting on the island continued until a peace treaty was signed in December 1885, and the French failed to secure control of the island for the time being.

The rest of the ships' careers passed relatively uneventfully. Magon was sent to the Pacific Ocean after arriving in Chinese waters, while Roland remained in the area. Villars and Forfait returned to France in 1887 and 1886, respectively, and they took part in training exercises with the French fleet in the early 1890s. Forfait made a deployment to what had by then become French Indochina from 1892 to 1896. Roland and Magon served in the North Atlantic Squadron in turns through the mid-1890s. By the late-1890s, all four ships were removed from active service. Villars and Magon were sold for scrap in 1896 and Forfait was converted into a storage hulk the following year. The last to leave active service, Roland was sold to ship breakers in 1898, though Forfait remained in the navy's inventory as a storage hulk until 1920, when she was finally sold for scrap.
