= Landing party =

Ship's crew assigned to take ground ashore

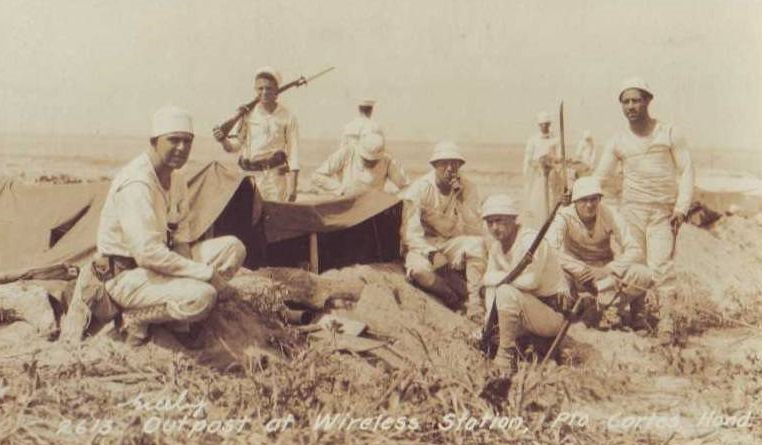
Armed U.S. landing party wearing dixie cup hats at Puerto Cortés, Honduras, circa 1903

A landing party is a portion of a ship's crew designated to go ashore from the ship and take ground, by force if necessary. In the landing party promulgated by the US Navy 1950 Landing Party Manual, the party was to be equipped with small arms – at least a rifle platoon for a destroyer; up to a rifle company plus machine gun platoon for a cruiser. Embarked Marines were to be used where possible.

== History ==
Since the American Revolution larger U.S. Navy warships had a detachment of Marines. As the Marine detachments were small, it was sometimes necessary to supplement their numbers with armed sailors when making opposed landings. By the late 1800s, the Navy developed formal doctrines for the organization and use of landing parties.

Prior to World War II, landing parties were used on at least 66 occasions during the 19th Century and 136 times in the Caribbean and Central America from 1900 to 1930. Two of the larger events were a naval landing party were used were the Second Battle of Fort Fisher in 1865 and the Occupation of Vera Cruz in 1914. At Fort Fisher, a force of 1,600 sailors and 400 Marines (organized into three divisions of sailors and one of Marines), supplemented a Union Army corps in assaulting the fort. A total of 6 Marines and 40 sailors received the Medal of Honor for heroism at Fort Fisher.

In 1918 the Navy published the Landing Force Manual which formalized doctrine for the employment of sailors as ground troops.

Following World War I, the Marine Corps expanded to have the Fleet Marine Force which could take over most missions previously performed by naval landing parties.

The last significant use of a naval landing party was during the Battle of Bataan in early 1942. With no hope of relief, sailors from the Subic Bay Naval Station formed a naval infantry unit. They were supplemented by crew members from the disabled submarine tender USS Canopus. In March 1942 they surrendered to the Japanese, along with other US forces on the Bataan Peninsula and endured the Bataan Death March. Of Canopus' crew of about 550, 212 were listed as killed or missing in action.

In World War II, amphibious landings were supported by large groups designated a "shore party". After World War II, the U.S. Navy organized Beachmaster Unit One and Beachmaster Unit Two.

Following World War II, the Navy retained the doctrine of using sailors as ground troops but did not use them in practice. In 1950, a new edition of the Landing Party Manual was published, which superseded the Landing Force Manual of 1938. In 1960, the 1950 Landing Party Manual was superseded by an updated edition.

Although landing parties are no longer part of U.S. Navy doctrine, the Navy's Seabees and SEALs are trained and equipped for ground combat.

In 1997 a group of Civil War re-enactors formed a unit called the U.S. Naval Landing Party.

== See also ==
- Landing operation
