= French cruiser Ducouëdic =

1860s French cruiser

- Ducouëdic's sister ship Bourayne in Algiers

History

France
- Name: Ducouëdic
- Builder: Arsenal de Brest
- Laid down: 28 April 1867
- Launched: 30 March 1869
- Commissioned: 4 September 1870
- Decommissioned: 1888
- Stricken: 25 January 1889

General characteristics
- Class & type: Bourayne-class cruiser
- Displacement: 1,296.2 t (1,275.7 long tons; 1,428.8 short tons)
- Length: 65 m (213 ft 3 in) (loa)
- Beam: 10.42 m (34 ft 2 in)
- Draft: 4.915 m (16 ft 1.5 in) (maximum)
- Installed power: 2 × Scotch marine boilers; 900 to 1,200 ihp (670 to 890 kW)
- Propulsion: 1 × compound engine; 1 × screw propeller
- Sail plan: Barque
- Speed: 11.3 to 12.8 knots (20.9 to 23.7 km/h; 13.0 to 14.7 mph)
- Range: 2,950 nautical miles (5,460 km; 3,390 mi) at 10 kn (19 km/h; 12 mph)
- Complement: 154
- Armament: 1 × 194 mm (7.6 in) gun; 2 × 140 mm (5.5 in) guns; 1 × 138 mm (5.4 in) gun

Ducouëdic was an unprotected cruiser of the Bourayne class built for the French Navy in the late 1860s. The French initially attempted to mount a 194 mm (7.6 in) gun aboard the ship to improve their shore bombardment capability. Such a large gun proved to be too heavy, and it was instead replaced with a 164 mm (6.5 in) gun. Ducouëdic was sent on a series of cruises abroad during her career. These began with a voyage to the Indian Ocean from 1871 to 1874. Next, she patrolled the eastern Mediterranean from 1876 to 1877. A third cruise took the ship to Cochinchina in Southeast Asia from 1878 to 1881. Ducouëdic operated in the Atlantic Ocean from 1886 to 1888. Struck from the naval register in early 1889, she was used in a variety of subsidiary roles until 1920, when she was placed for sale, though the details of her disposal are unknown.

== Design ==
The Bourayne class of unprotected cruiser was ordered as part of a major construction program to modernize the French cruising fleet. They were designed in the late 1860s; the ships were based on the earlier steam corvette Monge, but influenced by the armament adopted for the larger Sané-class cruisers. The Sané adopted an armament of just a few medium-caliber guns instead of a larger number of light weapons as had been used in older French cruisers. The French Navy wanted the new ships to be able to bombard coastal fortifications, which required the larger guns. A total of ten ships were ordered to the design.

=== Characteristics ===
Ducouëdic was 65 m (213 ft 3 in) long overall, and she had a beam of 10.42 m (34 ft 2 in). She had an average draft of 4.33 m (14 ft 2 in) that was at most 4.915 m (16 ft 1.5 in) at the stern, and she displaced 1,296.2 t (1,275.7 long tons; 1,428.8 short tons). She had a wooden hull with a straight stem. Her normal crew numbered 154 officers and sailors.

The ship's propulsion system consisted of a single horizontal compound engine that drove a single screw propeller. Steam for the engine was provided by two coal-fired Scotch marine boilers, which were vented through a funnel located amidships. The propulsion system was designed to produce 920 indicated horsepower (690 kW) for a top speed of around 12 knots (22 km/h; 14 mph). In service, these figures varied between 900 to 1,200 ihp (670 to 890 kW) and speeds of 11.3 to 12.8 knots (20.9 to 23.7 km/h; 13.0 to 14.7 mph). Coal storage amounted to 186.7 t (183.8 long tons; 205.8 short tons), which allowed the ship to steam for up to 2,950 nautical miles (5,460 km; 3,390 mi) at a cruising speed of 10 knots (19 km/h; 12 mph). The ship was fitted with a three-masted barque rig to supplement the steam engine on long voyages abroad.

Ducouëdic was completed with an armament that consisted of one 194 mm (7.6 in) rifled gun, two 140 mm (5.5 in) guns, and one 138 mm (5.4 in) gun. The ship's weaponry was changed again in the mid-1870s, and at that time the 194 mm gun was replaced by a 164 mm gun. The lighter guns were also superseded by five 138 mm (5.4 in) guns. Two 37 mm (1.5 in) Hotchkiss revolver cannon were added for close-range defense against torpedo boats. In the 1880s, the 164 mm gun was also replaced with a 138 mm gun.

== Service history ==
Ducouëdic was laid down on 28 April 1867 at the Arsenal de Brest shipyard in Brest, France. She was launched on 30 March 1869, and after completing fitting out, she was placed in limited commissioned on 4 September 1870 to begin sea trials. These were completed by December, and she was placed in the 3rd category of reserve at Brest on 16 December. She was recommissioned not long after, on 18 January 1871, though she was decommissioned again on 5 April. She returned to service on 22 June to carry prisoners from the Paris Commune; this duty lasted until 23 September, when she was decommissioned again.

The cruiser was reactivated again on 1 October 1871 for a cruise to a tour in the Indian Ocean and East African stations. Ducouëdic patrolled the area and defended French interests. At that time, the station also included the old screw frigate Clorinde and several smaller gunboats and an aviso. She operated on the station until late 1874, when she returned home, being decommissioned on 1 November. Ducouëdic next commissioned in 1876 for operations in the Levant that continued into 1877. In September that year, while she patrolled the waters off Ottoman Syria, 19 of the 152 men aboard contracted tapeworms.

After returning to France later that year, she received new boilers during a refit that lasted from late 1877 to 1878. Recommissioned again on 5 August 1878, she was sent abroad again, this time to the Cochinchina station, where the French sought to establish a colony. By 1880, the French squadron stationed in Cochinchina consisted of the hulk Tilsitt, Ducouëdic, the aviso Antilope, and eight small gunboats. Ducouëdic returned home again in 1881.

In 1886, Ducouëdic was assigned to the North Atlantic station, along with the screw frigate Minerve and the aviso Bouvet, the former being the station flagship. Ducouëdic and Minerve remained on station the following year. In March 1888, the naval minister Jules François Émile Krantz ordered the North Atlantic and South Atlantic divisions to be consolidated into the Atlantic Division. The new unit then consisted of the cruiser Aréthuse, the divisional flagship, Ducouëdic, the sloops Bisson and Dumont-d'Urville, and the gunboat Étoile. Krantz ordered Ducouëdic to be withdrawn from service that year, to be replaced by one of the cruiser Roland. Ducouëdic remained out of service until she was struck from the naval register on 25 January 1889. She was hulked at Rochefort and used as a mooring hulk until 1896. She was then used to store coal until 1914. She was placed for sale in 1920, but the details of her disposal are unrecorded.
