= French ship Kersaint =

At least three ships of the French Navy have been named Kersaint:

- French cruiser Kersaint, a Bourayne-class cruiser launched in 1869 and scrapped in 1903
- French destroyer Kersaint (1931), a Vauquelin-class destroyer launched in 1931 and sunk in 1942
- French destroyer Kersaint (D622), a T 47-class destroyer launched in 1953 and expended as a target in 1986
- French aviso Kersaint (1897), an aviso designed in 1897
