= French cruiser Segond =

1860s French cruiser

- Segond's sister ship Bourayne in Algiers

History

France
- Name: Segond
- Builder: Ernest Goüin et Cie.
- Laid down: 19 November 1867
- Launched: 24 April 1869
- Commissioned: 1 June 1869
- Decommissioned: 1894
- Stricken: 26 November 1894
- Fate: Broken up, 1896

General characteristics
- Class & type: Bourayne-class cruiser
- Displacement: 1,296.2 t (1,275.7 long tons; 1,428.8 short tons)
- Length: 65 m (213 ft 3 in) (loa)
- Beam: 10.42 m (34 ft 2 in)
- Draft: 4.915 m (16 ft 1.5 in) (maximum)
- Installed power: 2 × Scotch marine boilers; 900 to 1,200 ihp (670 to 890 kW)
- Propulsion: 1 × compound engine; 1 × screw propeller
- Sail plan: Barque
- Speed: 11.3 to 12.8 knots (20.9 to 23.7 km/h; 13.0 to 14.7 mph)
- Range: 2,950 nautical miles (5,460 km; 3,390 mi) at 10 kn (19 km/h; 12 mph)
- Complement: 154
- Armament: 1 × 194 mm (7.6 in) gun; 3 × 121 mm (4.8 in) guns

Segond was an unprotected cruiser of the Bourayne class built for the French Navy in the late 1860s. The French initially attempted to mount a 194 mm (7.6 in) gun aboard the ship to improve their shore bombardment capability. Such a large gun proved to be too heavy, and it was instead replaced with a 164 mm (6.5 in) gun. The ship was sent to Southeast Asia after entering service in 1870, and she was used as a commerce raider during the Franco-Prussian War in 1870. She captured two Prussian ships before the war ended in 1871. The ship returned home in 1873. Another overseas deployment took Segond to the Pacific station from 1877 to 1879. She made another cruise, this time to French West Africa, from 1882 to 1884. The ship remained out of service until 1893, when she was reactivated for a tour on the Atlantic station. During this period, she carried the king of Dahomey into exile following the end of the Second Franco-Dahomean War in 1894. Segond was struck from the naval register in late 1894 and broken up in 1896.

== Design ==
The Bourayne class of unprotected cruiser was ordered as part of a major construction program to modernize the French cruising fleet. The ships were designed in the late 1860s; they were based on the earlier steam corvette Monge, but influenced by the armament adopted for the larger Sané-class cruisers. The Sané adopted an armament of just a few medium-caliber guns instead of a larger number of light weapons as had been used in older French cruisers. The French Navy wanted the new ships to be able to bombard coastal fortifications, which required the larger guns. A total of ten ships were ordered to the design.

=== Characteristics ===
Segond was 65 m (213 ft 3 in) long overall, and she had a beam of 10.42 m (34 ft 2 in). She had an average draft of 4.33 m (14 ft 2 in) that was at most 4.915 m (16 ft 1.5 in) at the stern, and she displaced 1,296.2 t (1,275.7 long tons; 1,428.8 short tons). She had a wooden hull with a straight stem. Her normal crew numbered 154 officers and sailors.

The ship's propulsion system consisted of a single horizontal compound engine that drove a single screw propeller. Steam for the engine was provided by two coal-fired Scotch marine boilers, which were vented through a funnel located amidships. The propulsion system was designed to produce 920 indicated horsepower (690 kW) for a top speed of around 12 knots (22 km/h; 14 mph). In service, these figures varied between 900 to 1,200 ihp (670 to 890 kW) and speeds of 11.3 to 12.8 knots (20.9 to 23.7 km/h; 13.0 to 14.7 mph). Coal storage amounted to 186.7 t (183.8 long tons; 205.8 short tons), which allowed the ship to steam for up to 2,950 nautical miles (5,460 km; 3,390 mi) at a cruising speed of 10 knots (19 km/h; 12 mph). The ship was fitted with a three-masted barque rig to supplement the steam engine on long voyages abroad.

Segond was completed with an armament that consisted of one 194 mm (7.6 in) rifled gun and two 164 m (538 ft) M1864 guns, but shortly after she entered service in 1869, her armament was revised to the 194 mm gun and three 121 mm (4.8 in) guns. The ship's weaponry was changed again in the mid-1870s, and at that time the 194 mm gun was replaced by a 164 mm gun. The lighter guns were also superseded by five 138 mm (5.4 in) guns. In the 1880s, the 164 mm gun was also replaced with a 138 mm gun, and at least two 37 mm (1.5 in) Hotchkiss revolver cannon were added.

== Service history ==
Illustration of Segond's visit to Japan in December 1871; the ship is firing a salute to Emperor Meiji

The keel for Segond was laid down on 19 November 1867 at the Ernest Goüin et Cie. shipyard in Nantes. She was launched on 24 April 1869 and commissioned on 1 June to begin sea trials. These were completed in early 1870, when she ship was placed in full commission for active service. At some point thereafter, she moved to Lorient, from which she sailed on 22 June 1870 to join the division stationed in the Levant region. On 1 July, the Franco-Prussian War broke out, and by that time, Segond had moved to southeast Asia. She began to operate as a commerce raider, seizing German vessels. On 23 August, Segond caught the German merchant ship Turandot, which had been sailing from Hamburg to Hong Kong. Segond seized the ship and put a prize crew aboard, who took her to Saigon. After arriving there on 7 September, the French sold Turandot's cargo. At around the same time, Segond captured another German-flagged ship, Georg, which had been carrying a load of coal from Bremen to Shanghai. She, too, was seized, taken to Saigon and sold. The war with what was now unified Germany ended on 28 January 1871 with the Armistice of Versailles. In 1871, Segond herself moved to East Asian waters to protect French interests in China. In December, she visited Yokosuka, Japan, for repairs. While there, the ship was inspected by Emperor Meiji. The ship's tour in East Asia lasted into 1872, and she was decommissioned on 1 February 1873 after having returned to Lorient.

Segond next commissioned on 5 January 1877 for a cruise in the Pacific station. That year, Admiral Abel-Nicolas Bergasse du Petit-Thouars came aboard the ship with orders to raise the French flag in the New Hebrides islands, but by the time Segond arrived there, Britain had already claimed the islands. Later that year, Segond was sent to San Francisco, United States, to relay news from French Tahiti and a request for a new colonial governor, as the current governor had fallen seriously ill and Queen Pōmare IV refused to accept the proposed successor. During the deployment to the Pacific, the ship sailed to French Polynesia in March 1878 to assist in rescue and recovery efforts after a hurricane struck the islands. At that time, the ships assigned to the station also included the old screw frigate Magicienne, which was the flagship of the squadron, and the cruisers Beautemps-Beaupré, Seignelay, and Limier. In 1879, Segond toured the New Hebrides and conducted ethnographic surveys. The ship then joined the rest of the French squadron in Callao, Chile, to observe the fighting in the War of the Pacific and protect French interests in the region, along with warships from Britain, Germany, and the United States. After returning home later that year, she received new boilers during a refit that lasted from 1881 to 1882. Later that year, she was assigned to the South Atlantic Division, along with the old screw frigate Pallas, the aviso Labourdonnais, and the gunboats Tactique and Seudre.

By 1882, Segond had been sent to western Africa, and that year she surveyed the Casamance River in French Senegal. The ship was still in the region in 1884, and that year, she assisted the Portuguese gunboat Sado in demarcating the borders of Portuguese claims in Africa. The French vessel then sailed to Landana to attempt to mediate a dispute between locals and a group of Catholic missionaries. The ship later returned south. On 29 August, she departed Moçâmedes in Portuguese Angola, bound for Angra Pequena; she was short of coal, and had to make the voyage by sail alone. On 15 September, Segond arrived in Angra Pequena and surveyed the site as a potential base from which the French might operate cruisers. The ship departed two days later and sailed north. By 1891, Segond had returned to France and been reduced to the 3rd category of reserve for the duration of the year.

In 1893, she was assigned to the North Atlantic squadron, which included the unprotected cruisers Aréthuse and Magon and the aviso Hussard. In early 1894, following the end of the in the Second Franco-Dahomean War, Segond carried Béhanzin, the king of Dahomey, and a small entourage into exile. She embarked the group in Cotonou on 11 February and stopped first in on 1 March Dakar in French Senegal. From there, she sailed on to Fort-de-France on Martinique, where Béhanzin was placed under house arrest in Fort Tartenson. In April 1894, the cruiser Beautemps-Beaupré was commissioned to replaced Segond in the Atlantic Division, allowing her to return to Brest to be placed in reserve. The ship was struck from the naval register on 26 November that year. She was briefly used as a stationary training ship for engine room crews at Brest, but this service ended in 1896. She was sold to ship breakers later that year and dismantled.
