= French cruiser Kersaint =

1860s French cruiser

- Kersaint's sister ship Bourayne in Algiers

History

France
- Name: Kersaint
- Builder: Arsenal de Lorient
- Laid down: 24 January 1868
- Launched: 7 September 1869
- Commissioned: 17 August 1870
- Decommissioned: 1884
- Stricken: 16 December 1884
- Fate: Broken up, 1903

General characteristics
- Class & type: Bourayne-class cruiser
- Displacement: 1,296.2 t (1,275.7 long tons; 1,428.8 short tons)
- Length: 65 m (213 ft 3 in) (loa)
- Beam: 10.42 m (34 ft 2 in)
- Draft: 4.915 m (16 ft 1.5 in) (maximum)
- Installed power: 2 × Scotch marine boilers; 900 to 1,200 ihp (670 to 890 kW)
- Propulsion: 1 × compound engine; 1 × screw propeller
- Sail plan: Barque
- Speed: 11.3 to 12.8 knots (20.9 to 23.7 km/h; 13.0 to 14.7 mph)
- Range: 2,950 nautical miles (5,460 km; 3,390 mi) at 10 kn (19 km/h; 12 mph)
- Complement: 154
- Armament: 1 × 194 mm (7.6 in) gun; 3 × 140 mm (5.5 in) guns

Kersaint was an unprotected cruiser of the Bourayne class built for the French Navy in the late 1860s. The French initially attempted to mount a 194 mm (7.6 in) gun aboard the ship to improve their shore bombardment capability. Such a large gun proved to be too heavy, and it was instead replaced with a 164 mm (6.5 in) gun. Kersaint briefly served as a fishery protection ship after entering service in 1871, followed by an assignment to the Atlantic Station from 1872 to 1875. The ship was then sent to East Asian waters in 1881; by 1883, tensions with China had increased over French colonial aspirations in Tonkin. The ship saw little action during the Tonkin campaign, but did participate in the blockade of the region in 1883 and 1884. After being recalled later that year, Kersaint was struck from the naval register, though she remained in the navy's inventory until being sold to ship breakers in 1903.

== Design ==
The Bourayne class of unprotected cruiser was ordered as part of a major construction program to modernize the French cruising fleet. They were designed in the late 1860s; the ships were based on the earlier steam corvette Monge, but influenced by the armament adopted for the larger Sané-class cruisers. The Sané adopted an armament of just a few medium-caliber guns instead of a larger number of light weapons as had been used in older French cruisers. The French Navy wanted the new ships to be able to bombard coastal fortifications, which required the larger guns. A total of ten ships were ordered to the design.

=== Characteristics ===
Kersaint was 65 m (213 ft 3 in) long overall, and she had a beam of 10.42 m (34 ft 2 in). She had an average draft of 4.33 m (14 ft 2 in) that was at most 4.915 m (16 ft 1.5 in) at the stern, and she displaced 1,296.2 t (1,275.7 long tons; 1,428.8 short tons). She had a wooden hull with a straight stem. Her normal crew numbered 154 officers and sailors.

The ship's propulsion system consisted of a single horizontal compound engine that drove a single screw propeller. Steam for the engine was provided by two coal-fired Scotch marine boilers, which were vented through a funnel located amidships. The propulsion system was designed to produce 920 indicated horsepower (690 kW) for a top speed of around 12 knots (22 km/h; 14 mph). In service, these figures varied between 900 to 1,200 ihp (670 to 890 kW) and speeds of 11.3 to 12.8 knots (20.9 to 23.7 km/h; 13.0 to 14.7 mph). Coal storage amounted to 186.7 t (183.8 long tons; 205.8 short tons), which allowed the ship to steam for up to 2,950 nautical miles (5,460 km; 3,390 mi) at a cruising speed of 10 knots (19 km/h; 12 mph). The ship was fitted with a three-masted barque rig to supplement the steam engine on long voyages abroad.

Kersaint was completed with an armament that consisted of one 194 mm (7.6 in) rifled gun and three 140 mm (5.5 in) guns. By 1871, her 194 mm gun had been replaced with a 164 mm gun, the former having been deemed to be too heavy. The ship's weaponry was changed again in the mid-1870s, which then consisted of the 164 mm gun and five 138 mm (5.4 in) guns. In the 1880s, the 164 mm gun was also replaced with a 138 mm gun, and at least two 37 mm (1.5 in) Hotchkiss revolver cannon were added.

== Service history ==
Work on the new cruiser Kersaint began with her keel laying on 24 January 1868 at the Arsenal de Lorient shipyard in Lorient. She was launched on 7 September 1869, after which fitting-out work commenced. The ship was placed in limited commission on 17 August 1870 for sea trials, which continued into September, when she was pronounced ready for service. In April 1871, Kersaint sailed from Cherbourg to serve as a fishery protection vessel in the waters off Iceland. After completing her patrol, she was decommissioned in Cherbourg on 29 December that year. Kersaint next recommissioned on 22 February 1872 for service on the Newfoundland and Antilles stations in the Atlantic, which lasted until late 1875. On 21 September, she took on a pair of men who had been badly injured in an accident aboard the screw frigate Magicienne and carried them back to France. She was decommissioned again on 31 October 1875.

Kersaint was sent on abroad again in 1881 to serve with the Division Navale des Mers de Chine et du Japon (Naval Division of the Sea of China and Japan). In September, she was ordered to visit the primary ports on the island of Borneo, where the British had recently seized territory in North Borneo. By January 1882, the unit consisted of the ironclad Victorieuse, the unprotected cruisers Champlain and Villars, and the gunboat Lutin, and the unit was commanded by Rear Admiral Charles Meyer. Later that year, Champlain was replaced by the cruiser Volta, but Meyer's command remained otherwise unchanged, continuing into early 1883. Tensions in the region had risen considerably by mid-1883, particularly after the Battle of Hanoi in April. As a result, significant reinforcements under Rear Admiral Amédée Courbet were dispatched in early 1883 to strengthen French naval forces in the area as the Tonkin campaign got underway. With the arrival of Courbet's reinforcements, the unit was re-designated the Far East Squadron.

Kersaint was sent to Shanghai, China, in June 1883. As a result, she was not involved in the Battle of Thuận An in August 1883, where the bulk of Courbet's forces sent bombarded and then captured the Vietnamese coastal forts, or the Battle of Phủ Hoài, where only small gunboats could be used. In September, Kersaint was relieved at Shanghai by Volta, allowing the former to sail to Hong Kong, arriving there on 7 September. From there, she sailed to Hạ Long Bay on the Tonkin coast; at that time, it was expected that she would be ordered to return home, but the fighting in the area in August precluded her departure. The French thereafter embarked on a blockade of the Tonkin coast, but Kersaint and the other cruisers had few opportunities for success, owing to the limited trade in the region under normal circumstances, let alone during wartime. During this period, later in 1883, Kersaint participated in the occupation of Quảng Yên. Blockade operations continued until the Tianjin Accord was signed in May 1884, and during this period, the cruisers alternated one week on patrol with another at anchor with the rest of the squadron at Hạ Long Bay.

Kersaint was recalled home in late 1884, and after arriving, was struck from the naval register on 16 December. She was placed for sale that year, but was not sold for several years. She was last listed in the Navy's inventory in 1886, but she was not actually sold to ship breakers until 1903. She was subsequently broken up in Cherbourg.
