= French cruiser Kerguélen =

1860s French cruiser

- Kerguélen

History

France
- Name: Kerguélen
- Builder: Arsenal de Cherbourg
- Laid down: 17 August 1868
- Launched: 19 September 1872
- Commissioned: 1 November 1874
- Stricken: 2 February 1894
- Fate: Sold, 6 October 1913

General characteristics
- Class & type: Bourayne-class cruiser
- Displacement: 1,289.2 t (1,268.8 long tons; 1,421.1 short tons)
- Length: 65.16 m (213 ft 9 in) (loa)
- Beam: 10.42 m (34 ft 2 in)
- Draft: 4.8 m (15 ft 9 in) (maximum)
- Installed power: 2 × Scotch marine boilers; 900 to 1,200 ihp (670 to 890 kW)
- Propulsion: 1 × compound engine; 1 × screw propeller
- Sail plan: Barque
- Speed: 11.3 to 12.8 knots (20.9 to 23.7 km/h; 13.0 to 14.7 mph)
- Range: 3,700 nautical miles (6,900 km; 4,300 mi) at 10 kn (19 km/h; 12 mph)
- Complement: 154
- Armament: 6 × 138 mm (5.4 in) guns

Kerguélen was an unprotected cruiser of the Bourayne class built for the French Navy in the late 1860s. Kerguélen and her sister ship Duchaffault varied from the other members of the class in some details, including their armament, so they are sometimes considered to be a sub-class. The two ships were armed with a battery of six 138 mm (5.4 in) guns, all on the upper deck. Kerguélen was completed in 1875, but was not activated until 1878, when she was ordered abroad to protect French interests in East Asia, where she remained through mid-1881. She was recommissioned in 1885 to reinforce French units fighting the Sino-French War with China, though by the time she arrived, the fighting was over. The ship therefore immediately returned to France. She next recommissioned in 1889 to patrol the North Atlantic, and the following year she was sent south to participate in the First Franco-Dahomean War. Her activities during the conflict were limited to helping to enforce a blockade of the coast. Kerguélen was decommissioned in 1891 for repairs and saw little active service thereafter. She was used as a training ship from 1894 to 1898, then also as a headquarters for harbor vessels in Lorient until 1905. She was then converted into a barracks ship before being sold in 1913.

== Design ==
The Bourayne class of unprotected cruiser was ordered as part of a major construction program to modernize the French cruising fleet. The ships were designed in the late 1860s; they were based on the earlier steam corvette Monge, but influenced by the armament adopted for the larger Sané-class cruisers. The Sané adopted an armament of just a few medium-caliber guns instead of a larger number of light weapons as had been used in older French cruisers. The French Navy wanted the new ships to be able to bombard coastal fortifications, which required the larger guns. A total of ten ships were ordered to the design. The last pair, Kerguélen and Duchaffault were altered slightly, becoming a distinct sub-class.

=== Characteristics ===
Kerguélen was 65.16 m (213 ft 9 in) long overall, and she had a beam of 10.42 m (34 ft 2 in). She had an average draft of 4.257 m (13 ft 11.6 in) that was at most 4.8 m (15 ft 9 in) at the stern, and she displaced 1,289.3 t (1,268.9 long tons; 1,421.2 short tons). She had a wooden hull with a clipper bow. Her normal crew numbered 154 officers and sailors.

The ship's propulsion system consisted of a single horizontal compound engine that drove a single screw propeller. Steam for the engine was provided by two coal-fired Scotch marine boilers, which were vented through a funnel located amidships. The propulsion system was designed to produce 920 indicated horsepower (690 kW) for a top speed of around 12 knots (22 km/h; 14 mph). In service, these figures varied between 900 to 1,200 ihp (670 to 890 kW) and speeds of 11.3 to 12.8 knots (20.9 to 23.7 km/h; 13.0 to 14.7 mph). Coal storage amounted to 223.6 t (220.1 long tons; 246.5 short tons), which allowed the ship to steam for up to 3,700 nautical miles (6,900 km; 4,300 mi) at a cruising speed of 10 knots (19 km/h; 12 mph). The ship was fitted with a three-masted barque rig to supplement the steam engine on long voyages abroad.

The two Duchaffault-subclass ships carried a different armament than their half-sisters, consisting of a uniform main battery of six 138 mm (5.4 in) M1870 guns. One gun was on the raised forecastle, another was on the poop deck, and the other four were in barbette mounts, two per broadside. The ship also carried a 84 mm (3.3 in) mountain gun. Kerguélen received a pair of 37 mm (1.5 in) Hotchkiss revolver cannon for close-range defense against torpedo boats in 1878. She received four more Hotchkiss guns by 1889.

== Service history ==
Kerguélen, date and location unknown

Kerguélen was laid down on 17 August 1868 at the Arsenal de Cherbourg shipyard in Cherbourg. She was launched on 19 September 1872, after which fitting out commenced. She was commissioned on 1 November 1874 to begin sea trials, which were completed in January 1875. She was then reduced to the 3rd category of reserve on 17 January.

The ship next returned to service on 10 November 1878 for a deployment to the China station to protect French interests in the country. Kerguélen sailed from Cherbourg on 28 December and spent the next eighteen months abroad. In 1880, the French squadron on the China station consisted of the flagship, the screw frigate Thémis, Kerguélen, the cruiser Champlain, and the gunboat Lynx. Kerguélen was in Japanese waters in July 1880 when she, Thémis, and Champlain came to the assistance of the British ironclad warship HMS Iron Duke, which had grounded on a rock off the coast of Hokkaido. While trying to pull Iron Duke free, Champlain struck bottom herself, and while freeing herself, accidentally collided with Kerguélen. Neither ship was seriously damaged in the collision, though Champlain suffered some damage from the grounding. Kerguélen arrived back in Cherbourg on 8 June 1881. During a refit in 1883, her forecastle was extended by 2.5 m (8 ft 2 in).

Kerguélen was next reactivated in early 1885 to reinforce French forces waging the Sino-French War, but she arrived there on 11 April and the fighting was largely over. She did join the forces that had instituted a blockade of Formosa, however. Secret negotiations between French and Chinese representatives had already begun, as both countries were losing patience with the costly war, and in late April, an agreement was reached that ended the war, though it was not formally signed until 9 June. Following the end of the conflict, Kerguélen returned to France in company with the cruiser D'Estaing. The two cruisers towed several torpedo boats from Chinese waters to Saigon in southern Vietnam before continuing on for France.

In early 1889, Kerguélen carried out trials in Lorient to prepare for active service. As of 25 May, the ship had been assigned to the North Atlantic Squadron, along with the unprotected cruisers Aréthuse, Roland, and Sané. In August, Kerguélen stopped in Port-au-Prince, Haiti, during a period of political turmoil. The former Haitian president, François Denys Légitime, fled the country aboard Kerguélen, which took him to New York City. The ship remained on the station the following year, and the only change to the unit was the addition of the sloop Bisson. In March 1890, Kerguélen was sent to reinforce French forces fighting in the First Franco-Dahomean War. She arrived in Cotonou on 11 March, where Sané was already anchored. The aviso Ardent joined them there on 16 March. Additional French forces continued to arrive, including Roland, the cruiser Naïade, and the avisos Ardent, Goëland, and Brandon. The reinforcements solidified French control of the coastal enclaves and forced the Dahomeans to withdraw into the interior of the country. On 7 April, Kerguélen got underway to begin a blockade of communication between Grand-Popo and Ouidah, while the three avisos enforced the blockade to the west. The conflict ended in October with Dahomey agreeing to cede control of Cotonou to France and to recognize the French protectorate over Porto-Novo.

In 1891, Kerguélen was decommissioned for repairs that lasted most of the year; she returned to service for two months of trials that year. Kerguélen was eventually struck from the naval register on 2 February 1894. She was stationed in Lorient and used as a training ship for boiler room crews and as a repair hulk for the next four years. In 1898, she became the flagship of the harbor vessels in the port, and she continued to be used as a boiler training vessel. Beginning in 1905, she was converted into a barracks ship, a role she filled for the next seven years. The Navy ordered her to be placed for sale on 29 November 1912, and she was eventually sold on 6 October 1913.
