= French cruiser Beautemps-Beaupré =

1860s French cruiser

- Beautemps-Beaupré, probably in Algiers

History

France
- Name: Beautemps-Beaupré
- Builder: Arsenal de Brest
- Laid down: 19 November 1867
- Launched: 4 July 1872
- Commissioned: 18 November 1874
- Decommissioned: 1896
- Stricken: 11 December 1896
- Fate: Sold, 1909

General characteristics
- Class & type: Bourayne-class cruiser
- Displacement: 1,296.2 t (1,275.7 long tons; 1,428.8 short tons)
- Length: 65 m (213 ft 3 in) (loa)
- Beam: 10.42 m (34 ft 2 in)
- Draft: 4.915 m (16 ft 1.5 in) (maximum)
- Installed power: 2 × Scotch marine boilers; 900 to 1,200 ihp (670 to 890 kW)
- Propulsion: 1 × compound engine; 1 × screw propeller
- Sail plan: Barque
- Speed: 11.3 to 12.8 knots (20.9 to 23.7 km/h; 13.0 to 14.7 mph)
- Range: 2,950 nautical miles (5,460 km; 3,390 mi) at 10 kn (19 km/h; 12 mph)
- Complement: 154
- Armament: 1 × 164 mm (6.5 in) gun; 5 × 138 mm (5.4 in) guns

Beautemps-Beaupré was an unprotected cruiser of the Bourayne class built for the French Navy in the late 1860s. The ship was armed with a gun battery that was heavy for a vessel of her small size, which was intended to give her good shore bombardment capabilities. She carried a single 164 mm (6.5 in) gun and five 138 mm (5.4 in) guns all on the upper deck. Beautemps-Beaupré was sent on a major cruise abroad to the Pacific Ocean from 1877 to 1880, during which she participated in the suppression of the 1878 Kanak revolt in New Caledonia. Her next foreign deployment began in 1883 with the First Madagascar expedition, which sought to enforce French colonial claims on the island. Beautemps-Beaupré took part in heavy fighting around the island, bombarding enemy positions and sending landing parties ashore to seize coastal towns. The ship remained off Madagascar until 1891, by which time she had returned to France. She was sent abroad a third time in 1894, first to the South Atlantic, though she was transferred to French Indochina the following year. After being recalled home in 1896, she was struck from the naval register and used to store coal in Corsica until 1909; she was then placed for sale, but the details of her disposal are unknown.

== Design ==
The Bourayne class of unprotected cruiser was ordered as part of a major construction program to modernize the French cruising fleet. They were designed in the late 1860s; the ships were based on the earlier steam corvette Monge, but influenced by the armament adopted for the larger Sané-class cruisers. The Sané adopted an armament of just a few medium-caliber guns instead of a larger number of light weapons as had been used in older French cruisers. The French Navy wanted the new ships to be able to bombard coastal fortifications, which required the larger guns. A total of ten ships were ordered to the design.

=== Characteristics ===
Beautemps-Beaupré was 65 m (213 ft 3 in) long overall, and she had a beam of 10.42 m (34 ft 2 in). She had an average draft of 4.33 m (14 ft 2 in) that was at most 4.915 m (16 ft 1.5 in) at the stern, and she displaced 1,296.2 t (1,275.7 long tons; 1,428.8 short tons). She had a wooden hull with a straight stem. Her normal crew numbered 154 officers and sailors.

The ship's propulsion system consisted of a single horizontal compound engine that drove a single screw propeller. Steam for the engine was provided by two coal-fired Scotch marine boilers, which were vented through a funnel located amidships. The propulsion system was designed to produce 920 indicated horsepower (690 kW) for a top speed of around 12 knots (22 km/h; 14 mph). In service, these figures varied between 900 to 1,200 ihp (670 to 890 kW) and speeds of 11.3 to 12.8 knots (20.9 to 23.7 km/h; 13.0 to 14.7 mph). Coal storage amounted to 186.7 t (183.8 long tons; 205.8 short tons), which allowed the ship to steam for up to 2,950 nautical miles (5,460 km; 3,390 mi) at a cruising speed of 10 knots (19 km/h; 12 mph). The ship was fitted with a three-masted barque rig to supplement the steam engine on long voyages abroad.

Being one of the later members of the class, Beautemps-Beaupré entered service by the time much of the experimentation in armament arrangements had already been settled. Thus, unlike the earlier ships that attempted to mount a 194 mm (7.6 in) gun that was found to be too heavy, she was completed with an armament of a single 164 mm (6.5 in) gun and five 138 mm (5.4 in) guns. In the 1880s, the 164 mm gun was replaced with a 138 mm gun, and at least two 37 mm (1.5 in) Hotchkiss revolver cannon were added.

== Service history ==
Work on Beautemps-Beaupré began on 19 November 1867 with her keel laying at the Arsenal de Brest shipyard in Brest, France. Her launching took place on 4 July 1872, after which fitting out commenced. She was commissioned for sea trials on 18 November 1874, which were completed by March 1875. Beautemps-Beaupré was placed in reserve on 1 March. The ship remained out of service for the next two years. During this period, tests on purifying water from the ship's boilers were carried out aboard Beautemps-Beaupré. It was found that using a mild limewater solution removed sediment from the boilers and produced potable water.

=== Pacific cruise, 1877–1880 ===
Beautemps-Beaupré was recommissioned on 12 October 1877. She was sent on a major cruise aboard to patrol the Pacific and New Caledonia stations. By 1878, the ships assigned to the station also included the old screw frigate Magicienne, which was the flagship of the squadron, and the cruisers Segond, Seignelay, and Limier. At that time, capitaine de vaisseau (ship-of-the-line captain) Frédéric des Essarts served as the ship's commander. On 22 March, Beautemps-Beaupré left Nouméa to visit Australia. While on the way on 30 March, she encountered the French transport ship Allier, which was carrying a load of silver to Nouméa. Beautemps-Beaupré took the silver aboard to complete the delivery to Nouméa. She cruised along the coast of Australia, but did not stop to visit any ports. She arrived back in Nouméa on 8 April and was found to have suffered significant strain on the hull owing to the heavy seas, which required her deck to be recaulked.

In June, the Kanaks on New Caledonia revolted against French rule. Beautemps-Beaupré was at that time in Nouméa, having come to relieve the aviso Curieux. After receiving news of the rebellion, Beautemps-Beaupré was sent with a company of infantry to reinforce the local forces, arriving at the mouth of the Diahot River by early July. At that time, the French flotilla in the area also included a pair of armed transports, two schooners, and two small gunboats, in addition to Curieux. Beautemps-Beaupré sent a contingent of 50 men ashore at Canala and another 50 at Houaïlou, before sailing back to Diahot, where she sent a landing party of her own crew ashore to guard a small settlement. Additional forces arrived from the Pacific station and French Cochinchina and soon suppressed the rebellion. During these operations, Beautemps-Beaupré sailed to Oubatche, where her captain intervened after a Kanak attack on a home; he convinced the local chief to deescalate the situation.

Over the course of 1878–1879, Beautemps-Beaupré conducted experiments with coal that had been mined from the areas around Yahoué and Teremba Bay on New Caledonia, but the French found the coal to be poor quality and unusable in steam engines. These replicated previous tests carried out by the aviso Coëtlogon in 1875. The deployment the Pacific lasted through 1880, when she was relieved by the cruiser D'Estrées, allowing Beautemps-Beaupré to return to France.

=== Madagascar campaign ===
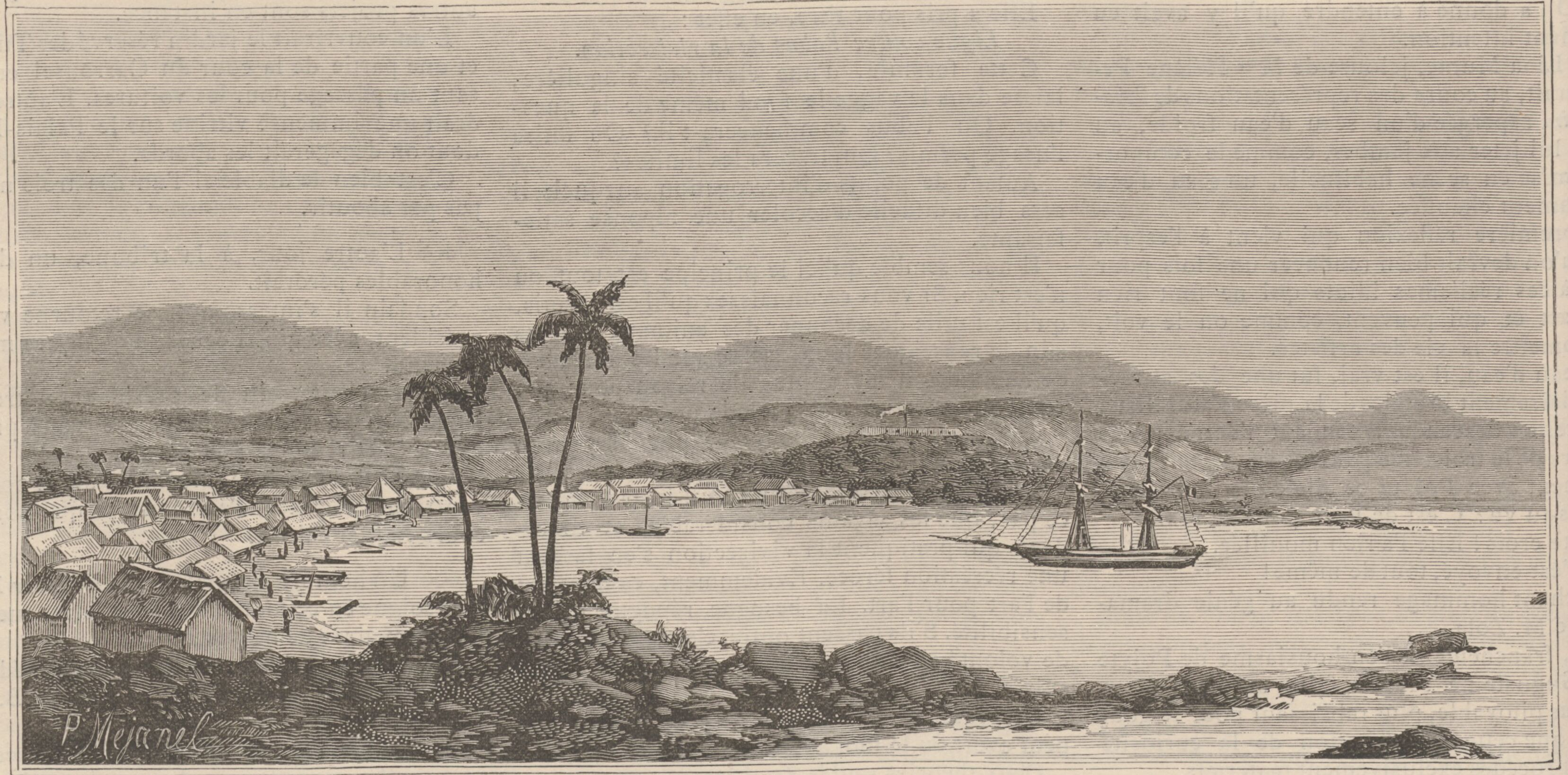
Sketch of Tamatave during the First Madagascar expedition

In 1882, the French government decided to seize the island of Madagascar as a colony, and in early 1883 the French sent Admiral Pierre Pierre aboard Beautemps-Beaupré to take command of a squadron that had been assembled off the island. The squadron also included the cruisers Forfait and Vaudreuil, the screw frigate Flore, the aviso Boursaint, and the gunboat Picque. On 7 May, Pierre sent Forfait to Tamatave while he took the rest of his squadron to the Ampasindava Peninsula, where he started the First Madagascar expedition by bombarding government positions there. Pierre took the rest of the squadron to join Forfait at Tamatave, where on 1 June he issued an ultimatum, which the Merina government rejected on 9 June. The next day, the French consul in Tamatave boarded Forfait, after which Pierre ordered a bombardment of the city. The ships opened fire at around 06:30 and set fire to the town, and after thirty minutes, slowed their fire to one shell every five minutes. After 08:15, the rate of fire was slowed further to one shot per hour, as the government forces had withdrawn to a camp about three miles from shore.

A landing party of about 500 was put ashore at Tamatave to secure the city, which soon became besieged by Merina forces. The French squadron then dispersed to attack other targets. Beautemps-Beaupré and Boursaint cruised to the north, bombarding Merina positions at Foulepointe, Mahambo, and Fenoarivo on 12 June. Over the following months, the ships assisted in the defense of Tamatave, including sending artillery ashore. On 12 November, Beautemps-Beaupré and Boursaint sailed to Port Choiseul, which they quickly captured. In April 1884, Rear Admiral Paul-Émile Miot arrived aboard the cruiser Naïade to take charge of the operations around Madagascar. He immediately instituted a blockade of the island, though he lacked enough ships to control the coastline. Miot divided his squadron into two divisions, and assigned Beautemps-Beaupré to the east coast division, along with Naïade, Boursaint, the gunboat Capricorne, and two support vessels.

Fighting continued on the island through 1884 and 1885, though Beautemps-Beaupré was not involved in any major operations for most of this period, as Miot sought to gather support from local rulers opposed to the Merina. On 27 November, Beautemps-Beaupré led an assault on the town of Amboanio, which held a fort that was part of the main defenses of the city of Vohemar. The cruiser opened a bombardment that quickly drove the defenders from the fortress, and then she sent a landing party to take possession of the fort. Beautemps-Beaupré lay in the roadstead for several days to provide fire support. On 5 December, additional men went ashore, including a detachment of sailors from Beautemps-Beaupré, to pursue the Merina forces that had fled from the initial bombardment. The French, with local support, defeated the Merina forces in a pitched battle, inflicting very heavy casualties on the Merina. On 8 January 1885, Miot appointed Captain Escond, the captain of Beautemps-Beaupré, as the local commander of the forces defending Vohemar. In late 1885, Beautemps-Beaupré joined an expedition to Diego-Suarez in company with the transports Allier and Scorff. The French captured the town and nearby Vohimaro without any resistance. A peace treaty was finally signed on 17 December 1885.

=== Later career ===
As of 25 May 1889, Beautemps-Beaupré was operating on the Madagascar station, the sole vessel assigned to the island. She was supported by the cruiser D'Estaing and the avisos Boursaint and Bouvet, which were assigned to the Indian Ocean station. By 1891, Beautemps-Beaupré had returned to France, where she remained in commission, but was not assigned to any particular unit.

In April 1894, Beautemps-Beaupré was recommissioned to join the Atlantic Division, where she replaced her sister ship Segond. At that time, the unit also included the unprotected cruisers Villars and Duquesne and the aviso Hussard. Beautemps-Beaupré was transferred to French Indochina later that year. The ship made the voyage from Libreville in French Equatorial Africa to Saigon in French Indochina by way of Cape Town, steaming some 9,200 nautical miles (17,000 km; 10,600 mi) in 61 days. She arrived off Cape Saint Jacques, just outside Saigon, on 26 October. She remained in French Indochina in 1895, and at that time, the squadron there also included ironclad Bayard, the squadron flagship, the protected cruisers Isly and Alger, and Forfait. In the immediate aftermath of the Chinese defeat in the First Sino-Japanese War in May 1895, the French sent Alger, Isly, and Beautemps-Beaupré up the Yangtze River to Nanking to demand that previous agreements regarding protection of French missionaries in the country be enforced. The ships arrived in the city on 29 June, but later that day, Beautemps-Beaupré received orders via telegram to depart immediately for Callao, Peru. She got underway the following morning.

In May 1896, the new aviso Amiral Parseval was commissioned to replace Beautemps-Beaupré. After returning home later that year, Beautemps-Beaupré was struck from the naval register on 11 December. She was used as a coal storage hulk in Corsica from 1898 to 1909, when she was placed for sale. The details of her disposal are unrecorded.
