= Dayot =

Dayot is both a given name and a surname. Notable people with the name include:

- Dayot Upamecano (born 1998), French footballer
- Adriano Hernández y Dayot (1870–1925), Filipino revolutionary, patriot, and military strategist
- Armand Dayot (1851–1934), French art critic, art historian and leftist politician
- Izabella Krizia Dayot Marquez (born 1992), Filipina actress
- Jean-Marie Dayot (1759–1809), French Navy officer and adventurer

== See also ==
- French cruiser Dayot
