= Vaudreuil =

Vaudreuil can refer to:

== Places ==
=== Canada ===
- Vaudreuil-Dorion, a city located west of Montreal, Quebec
- Terrasse-Vaudreuil, Quebec, a small Quebec municipality located near Montreal
- Vaudreuil-Soulanges Regional County Municipality, Quebec
- Vaudreuil-Soulanges (electoral district), a Canadian federal electoral district located in Quebec
- Vaudreuil (provincial electoral district), a Quebec provincial electoral district

=== France ===
- Le Vaudreuil, a commune in the Eure department in Haute-Normandie

=== United States ===
- Vaudreuil, Wisconsin, an unincorporated community

== People ==
- Pierre François de Rigaud, Marquis de Vaudreuil-Cavagnal (1698–1778), a Canadian colonial governor
- Philippe de Rigaud Vaudreuil (1643–1725), Governor General of New France (Canada)
- Louis-Philippe de Vaudreuil (1724–1802), Member of the French Navy
- Joseph Hyacinth Francois de Paule de Rigaud, Comte de Vaudreuil (1740–1817)

== Others ==
- Les Mustangs de Vaudreuil, a Junior hockey based in Vaudreuil-Dorion, Quebec
- French cruiser Vaudreuil, a 19th-century cruiser of the French Navy
