= French cruiser Hugon =

1860s French cruiser

- Hugon in 1885

History

France
- Name: Hugon
- Builder: Arsenal de Brest
- Laid down: 10 November 1867
- Launched: 6 August 1872
- Commissioned: 1 April 1873
- Stricken: 31 July 1895

General characteristics
- Class & type: Bourayne-class cruiser
- Displacement: 1,296.2 t (1,275.7 long tons; 1,428.8 short tons)
- Length: 65 m (213 ft 3 in) (loa)
- Beam: 10.42 m (34 ft 2 in)
- Draft: 4.915 m (16 ft 1.5 in) (maximum)
- Installed power: 2 × Scotch marine boilers; 900 to 1,200 ihp (670 to 890 kW)
- Propulsion: 1 × compound engine; 1 × screw propeller
- Sail plan: Barque
- Speed: 11.3 to 12.8 knots (20.9 to 23.7 km/h; 13.0 to 14.7 mph)
- Range: 2,950 nautical miles (5,460 km; 3,390 mi) at 10 kn (19 km/h; 12 mph)
- Complement: 154
- Armament: 1 × 164 mm (6.5 in) gun; 5 × 138 mm (5.4 in) guns

Hugon was an unprotected cruiser of the Bourayne class built for the French Navy in the late 1860s. The ship was armed with a gun battery that was heavy for a vessel of her small size, which was intended to give her good shore bombardment capabilities. She carried a single 164 mm (6.5 in) gun and five 138 mm (5.4 in) guns all on the upper deck. Though she was completed in 1873, Hugon was not commissioned for active service until 1877, when she was activated for a cruise to East Asia. The following year, she was moved to New Caledonia in response to the 1878 Kanak revolt against French colonial rule, which she helped to suppress. Hugon returned home in 1880 for a refit before being sent back to the Pacific in 1882. She returned to France at some point thereafter, and was deployed to the Pacific for a third time in 1885, this time to reinforce French units fighting the Sino-French War. The war was largely over by the time she arrived, however, so she saw no combat during the war, and she was recalled home in 1886. A final, major overseas cruise took the ship to the Indian Ocean from 1890 to 1895. Hugon was placed for sale in 1895, but the details of her disposal are unknown.

== Design ==
The Bourayne class of unprotected cruiser was ordered as part of a major construction program to modernize the French cruising fleet. The ships were designed in the late 1860s; they were based on the earlier steam corvette Monge, but influenced by the armament adopted for the larger Sané-class cruisers. The Sané adopted an armament of just a few medium-caliber guns instead of a larger number of light weapons as had been used in older French cruisers. The French Navy wanted the new ships to be able to bombard coastal fortifications, which required the larger guns. A total of ten ships were ordered to the design.

=== Characteristics ===
Hugon was 65 m (213 ft 3 in) long overall, and she had a beam of 10.42 m (34 ft 2 in). She had an average draft of 4.33 m (14 ft 2 in) that was at most 4.915 m (16 ft 1.5 in) at the stern, and she displaced 1,296.2 t (1,275.7 long tons; 1,428.8 short tons). She had a wooden hull with a straight stem. Her normal crew numbered 154 officers and sailors.

The ship's propulsion system consisted of a single horizontal compound engine that drove a single screw propeller. Steam for the engine was provided by two coal-fired Scotch marine boilers, which were vented through a funnel located amidships. The propulsion system was designed to produce 920 indicated horsepower (690 kW) for a top speed of around 12 knots (22 km/h; 14 mph). In service, these figures varied between 900 to 1,200 ihp (670 to 890 kW) and speeds of 11.3 to 12.8 knots (20.9 to 23.7 km/h; 13.0 to 14.7 mph). Coal storage amounted to 186.7 t (183.8 long tons; 205.8 short tons), which allowed the ship to steam for up to 2,950 nautical miles (5,460 km; 3,390 mi) at a cruising speed of 10 knots (19 km/h; 12 mph). The ship was fitted with a three-masted barque rig to supplement the steam engine on long voyages abroad.

Being one of the later members of the class, Hugon entered service by the time much of the experimentation in armament arrangements had already been settled. Thus, unlike the earlier ships that attempted to mount a 194 mm (7.6 in) gun that was found to be too heavy, she was completed with an armament of a single 164 mm (6.5 in) gun and five 138 mm (5.4 in) guns. In the 1880s, the 164 mm gun was replaced with a 138 mm gun, and at least two 37 mm (1.5 in) Hotchkiss revolver cannon were added.

== Service history ==
=== 1867–1882 ===
Hugon, date and location unknown

The keel for Hugon was laid down at the Arsenal de Brest shipyard in Brest, France, on 10 November 1867. She was launched on 6 August 1872. After completing fitting out, Hugon was placed in limited commission on 1 April 1873, but her crew was not complete until 11 June. Her initial testing was completed in September, and she was reduced to reserve status on 12 September. She was recommissioned for further trials on 18 April 1874, which lasted until 20 May, when she was decommissioned again and placed in the 3rd category of reserve.

Hugon remained out of service until 15 July 1877, when she was recommissioned for a cruise abroad. Over the following three years, she patrolled the China, New Caledonia, and Pacific stations. In 1878, she served as part of the Division Navale des Mers de Chine et du Japon (Naval Division of the Sea of China and Japan), along with the ironclad warship Armide, the screw corvette Cosmao, the cruiser La Clocheterie, and the gunboat Surprise. At that time, capitaine de vaisseau (CV—ship-of-the-line captain) François Galache served as the ship's commander. On 16 October, Hugon sailed from Yokohama, Japan, to reinforce the ships stationed in New Caledonia, part of the French response to the 1878 Kanak revolt against the colonial government. The reinforcements also included warships from the Pacific Station and soldiers from French Cochinchina, who quickly suppressed the rebellion. Galache decided against the most direct route, owing to the threat of severe storms in the central Pacific at that time of year, and instead sailed Hugon east and then southeast by way of Nauru. She eventually arrived in Nouméa, the capital of New Caledonia, on 21 November, having sailed some 3,000 nautical miles (5,600 km).

On 26 April 1879, Hugon departed Nouméa, bound for Valparaíso, Chile. While crossing, she lost one of her lifeboats in heavy seas. On 27 May, the ship was struck by a strong storm, and was driven some 72 nautical miles (133 km; 83 mi) off course, but was not seriously damaged. The ship arrived in Lota, Chile, on 15 June. She then moved to Callao, Chile, where she joined the rest of the French Pacific squadron. The ships stayed in Callao to observe the fighting in the War of the Pacific and protect French interests in the region, along with warships from Britain, Germany, and the United States. After returning home in 1880, she received new boilers. Hugon returned to the Pacific station in 1882, alongside the ironclad Triomphante and the cruisers Éclaireur and Limier.

=== 1885–1895 ===
The ship was deployed overseas in 1885 to join the Escadre de l'Extrême-Orient (Far East Squadron) to reinforce the unit during the Sino-French War. She sailed in company with the ironclad Turenne, the cruisers Magon, Roland, Primauguet, and Limier, and several gunboats and smaller craft. She departed Brest on 21 February and stopped in Algiers, French Algeria, on 3 March while en route. By 25 April, she had arrived on station in French Indochina, though a preliminary peace agreement had already been signed on 4 April, so Hugon saw no action during the war. On 1 July, Hugon joined a flotilla carrying a contingent of the 3rd Zouave Battalion from Haiphong to Huế. In late August, Hugon and two transport ships carried a contingent of some 627 infantry, along with supporting artillery and medical units, to suppress unrest around Thanh Hóa. Hugon remained in the area the following year, operating in the Tonkin area of French Indochina. That year, she came under command of CV Charles Touchard. The ship began the voyage home on 11 September 1886, sailing from Saigon, French Indochina; by 26 September, she passed the island of Diego Garcia, but did not stop there. Hugon reached the coast of eastern Africa on 5 October, to the north of Ras Hafun. From there, she followed the coast and then crossed the Gulf of Aden, arriving in Aden on 7 October.

After returning home, the ship was reboilered again in 1887. Later that year, she was assigned to the Atlantic station. By 1890, she was assigned to the Indian Ocean station, along with the cruiser D'Estaing, the avisos Bouvet and Boursaint, and two other vessels. Later that year, the gunboat Étoile and the transport Meurthe arrived to relieve Bouvet. The Indian Ocean station saw more reshuffling of ships in 1891, by which time the unit included Hugon, the cruiser Nielly, the aviso Labourdonnais, the gunboats Sagittaire and Étoile, and a transport. By 1892, the unit remained unchanged apart from the substitution of the cruiser Primauguet in place of Nielly. In 1893, Hugon was called to patrol the east coast of Madagascar, including the town of Vatomandry, owing to significant arms shipments. She joined the cruiser Primauguet, which was already on station there. In 1894, the American merchant vessel Joseph Ropes ran aground off Tamatave, Madagascar, and Hugon carried the local French administrator to seize a load of gunpowder that had been salvaged from the wrecked vessel. Hugon was eventually struck from the naval register on 31 July 1895 and placed for sale at Lorient. The details of her disposal are unrecorded.
