= French cruiser Forfait =

French naval vessel of the 1880s

- Forfait, date unknown

History

France
- Name: Forfait
- Builder: Société Nouvelle des Forges et Chantiers de la Méditerranée
- Laid down: 2 November 1876
- Launched: 6 February 1879
- Commissioned: 1 September 1879
- In service: 14 August 1880
- Out of service: 17 July 1896
- Stricken: 26 April 1897
- Fate: Hulked, 1897; Sold for scrap, 1920

General characteristics
- Class & type: Villars-class cruiser
- Displacement: 2,321 t (2,284 long tons)
- Length: 74.18 m (243 ft 4 in) lwl
- Beam: 11.62 m (38 ft 1 in)
- Draft: 5.13 m (16 ft 10 in)
- Installed power: 6 × fire-tube boilers; 2,160 ihp (1,610 kW)
- Propulsion: 1 × compound steam engine; 1 × screw propeller
- Sail plan: Full ship rig
- Speed: 14.7 knots (27.2 km/h; 16.9 mph)
- Range: 4,810 nmi (8,910 km; 5,540 mi) at 10 knots (19 km/h; 12 mph)
- Complement: 264
- Armament: 15 × 138.6 mm (5.46 in) guns; 2 × 37 mm (1.5 in) Hotchkiss revolver cannon

Forfait was an unprotected cruiser of the Villars class built for the French Navy in the 1870s. The ships were designed for service in the French colonial empire, and they carried a relatively heavy battery of fifteen 138.6 mm (5.46 in) guns, and could steam at a speed of 14.5 knots (26.9 km/h; 16.7 mph). The ship was laid down in 1876 and she was completed in 1880. The following year, Forfait was sent to the Indian Ocean, and in 1883–1885, she took part in the First Madagascar expedition, France's first attempt to conquer Madagascar. During the conflict, she bombarded forces loyal to the Merina Kingdom and helped to institute a blockade of ports controlled by the Merina government. Forfait returned to France in 1886, was modernized in 1888, and was deployed to French Indochina from 1892 to 1896. She was placed in reserve after returning to France in 1896, converted into a hulk, and used for storage 1914. She was eventually sold for scrap in 1920.

== Design ==
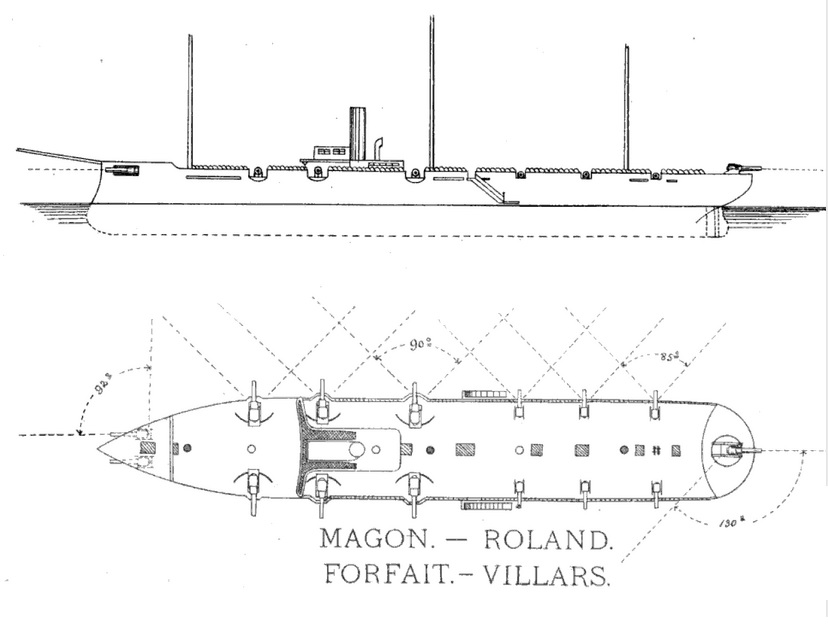
Plan and profile view of the Villars class

The four ships of the Villars class were ordered under the auspices of the naval plan of 1872, which was laid out to modernize the French Navy in the aftermath of the Franco-Prussian War of 1870–1871. The navy sought new unprotected cruisers that carried a heavier armament than earlier vessels, while maintaining a similar size to keep costs from increasing during a period of limited naval budgets. The design for the ships was drawn up by Victorin Sabattier. The vessels were intended to serve overseas in the French colonial empire.

Forfait was 74.18 m (243 ft 4 in) long at the waterline, with a beam of 11.62 m (38 ft 1 in) and an average draft of 5.1 m (16 ft 9 in). She displaced 2,321 t (2,284 long tons; 2,558 short tons) as designed. The ship had a ram bow and an overhanging stern. Her crew amounted to 264 officers and enlisted men. The ship's propulsion system consisted of a single compound steam engine driving a screw propeller. Steam was provided by six coal-burning fire-tube boilers that were ducted into a single funnel. Her machinery was rated to produce 2,160 indicated horsepower (1,610 kW) for a top speed of 14.5 knots (26.9 km/h; 16.7 mph). At a more economical speed of 10 knots (19 km/h; 12 mph), the ship could steam for 4,800 nautical miles (8,900 km; 5,500 mi).

The ship was armed with a main battery of fifteen 138.6 mm (5.46 in) M1870M 21.3-caliber guns. Two were placed in the forecastle, firing through embrasures as chase guns, one was atop the stern, and the remainder were placed in an amidships battery on the upper deck, six guns per broadside. Of the broadside guns, the forward three on each side were placed in sponsons, while the remaining three guns were in pivot mounts firing through embrasures. A pair of 37 mm (1.5 in) Hotchkiss revolver cannon provided close-range defense against torpedo boats. She also carried a pair of 86.5 mm (3.41 in) bronze mountain guns or a single 65 mm (2.6 in) field gun that could be sent ashore with a landing party.

== Service history ==
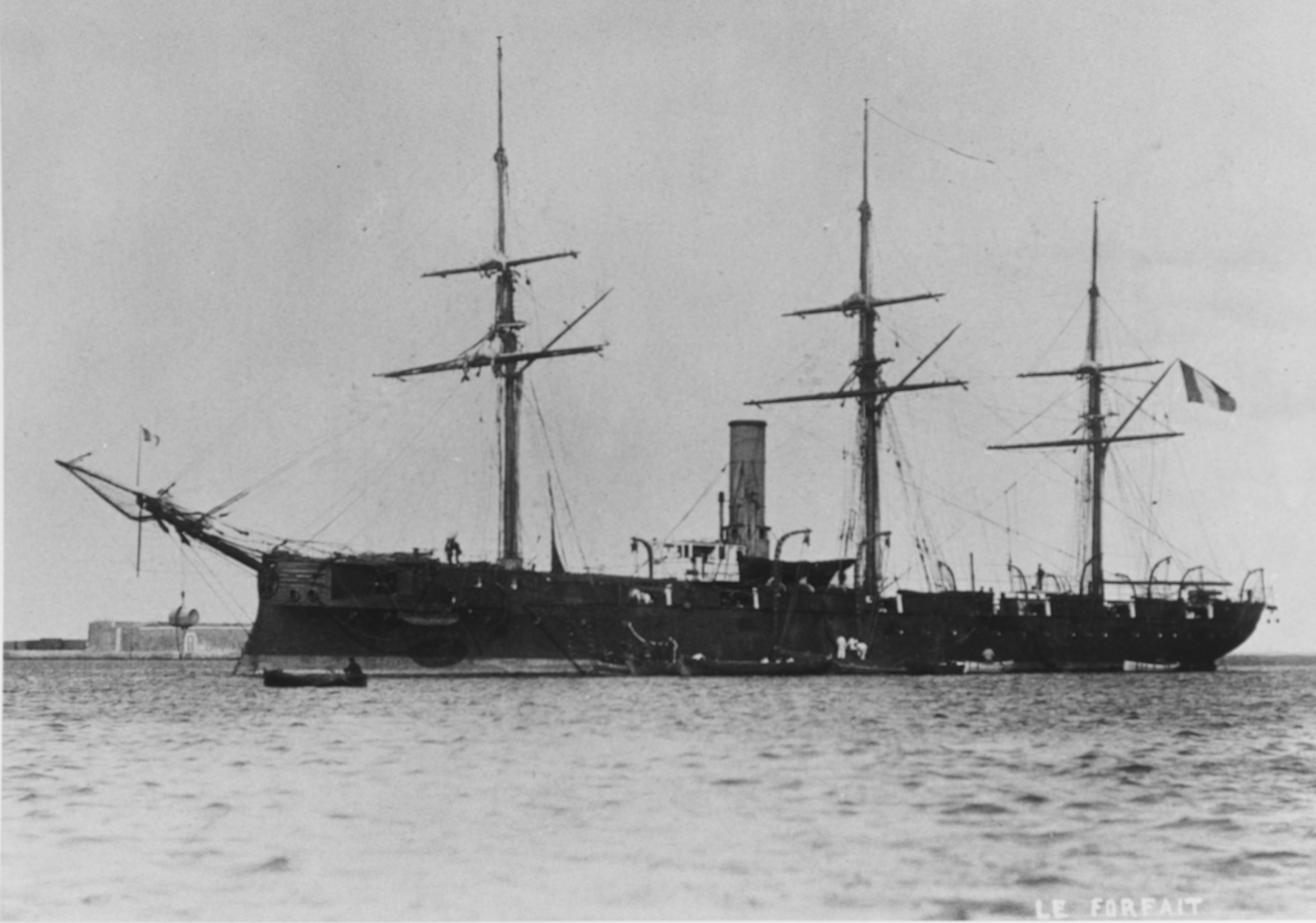
Forfait at Algiers, probably in the mid-1880s

The keel for Forfait was laid down at the Société Nouvelle des Forges et Chantiers de la Méditerranée shipyard in La Seyne-sur-Mer on 2 November 1876. She was launched on 6 February 1879, and was commissioned to begin sea trials on 1 September, though the ship was still not yet complete. Installation of her propulsion system, which had begun on 28 May, was not finished until 15 October. The ship thereafter carried out her initial testing, including full-power tests on 9 March 1880. She was pronounced completed the following month, and on 21 April, she was placed in the 2nd category of reserve. Forfait was reactivated on 14 August 1880 for further trials, after having had her original screw replaced. Further testing was carried out from 13 to 16 December.

=== Madagascar campaign ===
She lay out of service until 3 October 1881, when she was placed back in commission for a deployment to the Indian Ocean, where she was to replace La Clocheterie. In 1882, the French government decided to seize Madagascar as a colony, in part in reaction to an attempt by the Merina government to seize existing French colonies at Nosy Faly and Nosy Mitsio. Forfait sailed to Nosy Be, where her commander, Captain Le Timbre, went ashore to remove flags that the Merina had raised in the area. The ship then sailed to Tamatave to observe developments. Le Timbre then assembled the French warships that were in the region as a show of force to deter further hostile acts by the Merina government. These ships included the cruiser Vaudreuil, the aviso Bruat, the gunboat Picque, and the transprot ship Nièvre. To reinforce the squadron, the navy sent the cruiser Beautemps-Beaupré with Admiral Pierre Pierre. He was ordered to lead an expedition to invade the island. By April 1883, Pierre had received additional forces, bringing the total strength of his squadron to the cruisers Forfait, Beautemps-Beaupré, and Vaudreuil, the screw frigate Flore, the aviso Boursaint, and Picque.

On 7 May, Piere sent Forfait to Tamatave while he took the rest of his squadron to the Ampasindava Peninsula, where he started the First Madagascar expedition by bombarding government positions there. Pierre then sailed with the squadron to join Forfait at Tamatave, where on 1 June he issued an ultimatum, which the Merina government rejected on 9 June. The next day, the French consul in Tamatave boarded Forfait, after which Pierre ordered a bombardment of the city. The ships opened fire at around 06:30 and set fire to the town, and after thirty minutes, slowed their fire to one shell every five minutes. After 08:15, the rate of fire was slowed further to one shot per hour, as the government forces had withdrawn to a camp about three miles from shore. During the attack, the British sloops HMS Dryad and Dragon interfered with the bombardment when the former vessel deliberately moved into the French line of fire, blocking them from shelling the fortifications. The British commander, Charles Johnstone, demanded that Pierre formally request he move his ship.

On 11 June, Pierre sent ashore a landing party of 600 men drawn from his ships, which covered their seizure of the coastal fort at Tamatave. The next day, Forfait and the armed transport Nièvre sailed south to bombard Ivondrona, a few miles south of Tamatave. The men ashore fortified their positions with guns taken from the ships as Merina forces gathered to evict them, though neither side had sufficient strength to launch a major offensive. In August, France dispatched a force of 700 men aboard the transport Creuse, accompanied by the cruiser Naïade to strengthen the garrison at Tamatave. Pierre was removed from command in September and replaced by Rear Admiral Charles-Eugène Galiber, who arrived in September. The stalemate at Tamatave continued and in late October, the French and Merina governments entered into negotiations, though fighting continued. Galiber sent several ships to attack fortresses that had previously been bombarded by the French, but had since been reoccupied by Merina forces; Forfait was sent to retake the fortress at Mahambo. On 16 November, Forfait and Picque were at Mahajanga, where they blocked an attempt by Merina forces to seize the queen of the Sakalava, Binao. Forfait sent a landing party ashore to assist the Sakalavan garrison and both ships provided gunfire support. The two ships were still there on 31 December, when their gunfire helped to turn back another Merina attack on the city.

French forces continued to be drawn into the campaign. In April 1884, Rear Admiral Paul-Émile Miot arrived aboard the cruiser Naïade to take charge of the operations around Madagascar. He immediately instituted a blockade of the island, though he lacked enough ships to control the coastline. Miot divided his squadron into two divisions, and assigned Forfait as the flagship of the west coast division, along with the gunboats Chacal and Picque. Because of the force limitations, the blockade focused on a few ports, including Mahanoro and Fenoarivo Atsinanana. Fighting continued on the island through 1884 and 1885, though Forfait was not involved in any major operations. A peace treaty was finally signed aboard Naïade on 17 December 1885. By 1886, the French squadron operating off Madagascar also included the cruisers Naïade, Lapérouse, and Limier, the gunboats Picque, Chacal, and Capricorne, and the aviso Labourdonnais. The ships were supported by a pair of transport vessels.

=== Later career ===
Forfait in port, date unknown

Later in 1886, Forfait returned to France. She was overhauled in 1888 and received new boilers. Forfait was not initially assigned to the ships that were to be mobilized to participate in the large-scale fleet maneuvers of 1890, but after the unprotected cruiser Nielly was damaged in an accident, Forfait took her place in the maneuver fleet. The exercises took place off Brest, France, from 6 to 13 July. In 1891, Forfait was stationed at Brest, along with the cruisers Nielly and Éclaireur and the coastal defense ships Fulminant and Tempête. The ships were mobilized in June to take part in limited training exercises. The ships were kept in commission for the mandatory 28 days, and were sent to sea individually for training; no organized maneuvers were held that year. Forfait was otherwise kept out of service in reserve for the rest of the year.

She made a second deployment abroad, this time to French Indochina in East Asia, from 1892 to 1896. During this period, in 1894, the unit also included ironclad Bayard and the aviso Inconstant, along with the gunboats Lion and Comète. In 1895, the unit consisted of Forfait, Bayard, the modern protected cruisers Isly and Alger, the unprotected cruisers Beautemps-Beaupré and Duquay-Trouin, and six gunboats. The following year, the strength of the unit was reduced to just Forfait, Bayard, Isly, Alger, and four gunboats. After returning to France, Forfait was paid off into reserve at Rochefort on 17 July 1896. She was struck from the naval register on 26 April 1897. She was thereafter converted into a mooring hulk between 1897 and 1899. She served in that capacity at Rochefort until 1914. She remained in the harbor there until 1920, when she was sold to be broken up.
