= French cruiser Duchaffault =

1860s French cruiser

- Duchaffault

History

France
- Name: Duchaffault
- Namesake: Louis Charles du Chaffault de Besné
- Builder: Arsenal de Cherbourg
- Laid down: 17 August 1868
- Launched: 17 October 1872
- Commissioned: 10 September 1874
- Stricken: 17 November 1896
- Fate: Broken up, 1907

General characteristics
- Class & type: Bourayne-class cruiser
- Displacement: 1,289.2 t (1,268.8 long tons; 1,421.1 short tons)
- Length: 65.16 m (213 ft 9 in) (loa)
- Beam: 10.42 m (34 ft 2 in)
- Draft: 4.8 m (15 ft 9 in) (maximum)
- Installed power: 2 × Scotch marine boilers; 900 to 1,200 ihp (670 to 890 kW)
- Propulsion: 1 × compound engine; 1 × screw propeller
- Sail plan: Barque
- Speed: 11.3 to 12.8 knots (20.9 to 23.7 km/h; 13.0 to 14.7 mph)
- Range: 3,700 nautical miles (6,900 km; 4,300 mi) at 10 kn (19 km/h; 12 mph)
- Complement: 154
- Armament: 6 × 138 mm (5.4 in) guns

Duchaffault was an unprotected cruiser of the Bourayne class built for the French Navy in the late 1860s. (Note: Duchaffault's name was incorrectly recorded as "Duchaffaut" in official records until 12 May 1887 when the French Navy corrected the mistake.) Duchaffault and her sister ship Kerguélen varied from the other members of the class in some details, including their armament, so they are sometimes considered to be a sub-class. The two ships were armed with a battery of six 138 mm (5.4 in) guns, all on the upper deck. Duchaffault was sent on a cruise to Indochina from 1874 to 1878 to protect French interests in the region. She had been sent to the Pacific Ocean by 1885, when she was ordered to China to reinforce French units there during the Sino-French War. She took part in the Pescadores campaign, where she helped to conquer the islands. After the war ended later that year, she returned to the Pacific, where she remained until 1888, when she sailed back to France. A second deployment to the Pacific followed from 1891 to 1895. After returning home the following year, Duchaffault was struck from the naval register and then used to store coal until 1907, when she was broken up.

== Design ==
The Bourayne class of unprotected cruiser was ordered as part of a major construction program to modernize the French cruising fleet. The ships were designed in the late 1860s; they were based on the earlier steam corvette Monge, but influenced by the armament adopted for the larger Sané-class cruisers. The Sané adopted an armament of just a few medium-caliber guns instead of a larger number of light weapons as had been used in older French cruisers. The French Navy wanted the new ships to be able to bombard coastal fortifications, which required the larger guns. A total of ten ships were ordered to the design. The last pair, Duchaffault and Kerguélen were altered slightly, becoming a distinct sub-class.

=== Characteristics ===
Duchaffault was 65.16 m (213 ft 9 in) long overall, and she had a beam of 10.42 m (34 ft 2 in). She had an average draft of 4.257 m (13 ft 11.6 in) that was at most 4.8 m (15 ft 9 in) at the stern, and she displaced 1,289.3 t (1,268.9 long tons; 1,421.2 short tons). She had a wooden hull with a clipper bow. Her normal crew numbered 154 officers and sailors.

The ship's propulsion system consisted of a single horizontal compound engine that drove a single screw propeller. Steam for the engine was provided by two coal-fired Scotch marine boilers, which were vented through a funnel located amidships. The propulsion system was designed to produce 920 indicated horsepower (690 kW) for a top speed of around 12 knots (22 km/h; 14 mph). In service, these figures varied between 900 to 1,200 ihp (670 to 890 kW) and speeds of 11.3 to 12.8 knots (20.9 to 23.7 km/h; 13.0 to 14.7 mph). Coal storage amounted to 223.6 t (220.1 long tons; 246.5 short tons), which allowed the ship to steam for up to 3,700 nautical miles (6,900 km; 4,300 mi) at a cruising speed of 10 knots (19 km/h; 12 mph). The ship was fitted with a three-masted barque rig to supplement the steam engine on long voyages abroad.

The two Duchaffault-subclass ships carried a different armament than their half-sisters, consisting of a uniform main battery of six 138 mm (5.4 in) M1870 guns. One gun was on the raised forecastle, another was on the poop deck, and the other four were in barbette mounts, two per broadside. The ship also carried a 84 mm (3.3 in) mountain gun.Duchaffault received five 37 mm (1.5 in) Hotchkiss revolver cannon for close-range defense against torpedo boats in 1884. A sixth Hotchkiss was added by 1889.

== Service history ==
Duchaffault, which was named for Admiral Louis Charles du Chaffault de Besné, was laid down at the Arsenal de Cherbourg shipyard in Cherbourg on 17 August 1868. Her completed hull was launched on 17 October 1872, and fitting-out work was completed by 10 September 1874 when she was commissioned for sea trials. These were completed in October, and she thereafter received orders to sail to Indochina to join the newly created Indochina Division, which also included cruiser D'Estrées, the screw corvette Decrès, and several gunboats and avisos. Duchaffault remained in Indochinese waters through 1878. By that time, the station also included screw corvette Cosmao, the avisos Surcouf and Antilope, and nine gunboats.

=== Sino-French War ===
By early 1885, Duchaffault had been sent on another overseas deployment, and was on station in New Caledonia when she was recalled to Chinese waters to reinforce French forces during the Sino-French War. The war had started over French attempts to seize control of Indochina, which the Chinese had viewed as a traditional subject. She arrived in the area in February 1885, and she joined a blockade force off the mouth of the Tamsui River on the island of Formosa. The other ships included the ironclad Atalante and the cruiser Duguay-Trouin. Numerous other ironclads and cruisers were stationed at other locations around the island to complete the blockade. The blockade was not particularly effective, however, as the French lacked sufficient numbers of vessels to enforce it.

In March, the French commander Admiral Amédée Courbet secured approval from Paris to launch an attack on the Pescadores islands, which would both serve as a better base of operations for the French fleet than Keelung, and also deny their use to Chinese vessels that were then seeking to break through the Formosa blockade. By 28 March, Courbet had assembled a flotilla that included Duchaffault, the ironclads Bayard and Triomphante, the cruiser D'Estaing, and the troopship Annamite, which was carrying some 400 soldiers taken from the Keelung garrison. They sortied in the early hours of 29 March to begin the Pescadores campaign and arrived off the islands later that morning; Duchaffault and D'Estaing were assigned to bombard a coastal fortification on Plate Island.

The Chinese garrison again opened fire first, but the French ships quickly neutralized the Chinese batteries within an hour of the beginning of the action. Duchaffault then moved to support Bayard in an attack on Fort Makung, which protected the capital at Makung. These bombardments demolished the fortifications on the islands, which allowed Annamite to send the soldiers ashore on the southern end of the main island later in the afternoon. On the morning of 30 March, Duchaffault, Bayard, Annamite, and the gunboat Vipère began to force their way into Makung harbor to support the marine landing party as it fought its way toward capturing the provincial capital. Additional men from some of the ships were landed to supplement the soldiers, and by 1 April, Fort Makung had been seized, completing their conquest of the Pescadores. The purpose of invading the Pescadores soon became moot, however, as just three days later, a preliminary peace agreement was signed.

=== Later career ===
Duchaffault had moved to the New Caledonia station by 1886. At that time, the station also included the avisos Bruat and Loyalty and the transport ships Dives, Allier, and Navarin. In November, Duchaffault sailed to the New Hebrides to punish locals who had murdered a British national employed by a French trading firm there. She remained in New Caledonia through 1887, along with the cruiser Volta, the aviso Loyalty, and Dives. Having returned home by 1888, Duchaffault underwent a refit that included installation of new boilers and the addition of the 37 Hotchkiss guns; the work lasted into 1889.

Duchaffault was sent on another deployment abroad by 1891, this time to the Pacific station, where she patrolled French colonies in the Pacific. There, she joined the unprotected cruisers Dubourdieu and Champlain and the aviso-transport Saône. She remained there through 1893, and at that time, the unit also included the cruisers Duguay-Trouin and Dubourdieu. By early 1895, Duchaffault had moved to South America. In March, the ship sent a landing party ashore in Callao, Peru, to protect French nationals during a period of unrest. Following the resignation of Andrés Avelino Cáceres as president of Peru, the ship carried him into exile at Buenos Aires, Brazil, in April.

The ship was eventually struck from the naval register on 17 November 1896. In January 1897, she was converted into a coal storage hulk at Toulon. The following year, she was taken to Bizerte in French Tunisia, where she remained through 1907. She was sold for scrap that year and broken up that year in Bizerte.
