= French cruiser Seignelay =

- Seignelay in Toulon early in her career

History

France
- Name: Seignelay
- Ordered: 3 September 1866
- Builder: Toulon arsenal
- Laid down: 12 September 1866
- Launched: 5 February 1874
- Commissioned: 20 October 1874
- Stricken: 16 May 1892
- Fate: Sold, 1892

General characteristics
- Class & type: Sané-class cruiser
- Displacement: 1,943 t (1,912 long tons; 2,142 short tons)
- Length: 81.51 m (267 ft 5 in) loa
- Beam: 11.01 m (36 ft 1 in)
- Draft: 5.52 m (18 ft 1 in) (max)
- Installed power: 6 × fire-tube boilers; 1,800–2,000 ihp (1,300–1,500 kW)
- Propulsion: 1 × compound engine; 1 × screw propeller
- Sail plan: Barque rig
- Speed: 15 knots (28 km/h; 17 mph)
- Range: 6,140 nmi (11,370 km; 7,070 mi) at 10 knots (19 km/h; 12 mph)
- Complement: 206
- Armament: 8 × 138.6 mm (5.46 in) guns

Seignelay was an unprotected cruiser built for the French Navy in the late 1860s and early 1870s, second of three ships in the Sané class.

== Design ==
Seignelay was 81.51 m (267 ft 5 in) long overall, and she had a beam of 11.01 m (36 ft 1 in). She had an average draft of 4.84 m (15 ft 11 in) that was at most 5.52 m (18 ft 1 in) at the stern, and she displaced 1,943 t (1,912 long tons; 2,142 short tons). She had a wooden hull with a straight stem. Her normal crew numbered 206 officers and sailors.

The ship's propulsion system consisted of a single horizontal compound engine that drove a single screw propeller. Steam for the engine was provided by six coal-burning fire-tube boilers, which were vented through a funnel located amidships. The propulsion system was designed to produce 1,800 to 2,000 indicated horsepower (1,300 to 1,500 kW) for a top speed of around 15 knots (28 km/h; 17 mph). In her initial testing, Seignelay reached a top speed of 14.47 knots (26.80 km/h; 16.65 mph) from 1,804 ihp (1,345 kW). Coal storage amounted to 336 t (331 long tons; 370 short tons), which allowed the ships to steam for up to 6,140 nautical miles (11,370 km; 7,070 mi) at a cruising speed of 10 knots (19 km/h; 12 mph). The ship was fitted with a three-masted barque rig to supplement the steam engine on long voyages abroad.

Seignelay was completed with a uniform battery of eight 138.6 mm (5.46 in) guns. Two of the guns were placed on rotating pivot mounts, one forward and the other aft. The remaining six guns were placed amidships, firing through embrasures in the bulwarks, three guns per broadside. In addition, she carried three 86.5 mm (3.41 in) bronze cannon for use aboard the ship's boats.

== Service history ==
Seignelay was built at the Toulon arsenal, having been ordered from the shipyard on 3 September 1866. Her keel was laid down on 12 September, but work proceeded very slowly, and the completed hull was not launched until 5 February 1874. While the shipyard was completing fitting-out work in a dry dock, Seignelay caught on fire on 6 June, though the fire was quickly put out by flooding the dock. She was commissioned on 20 October to begin sea trials in January 1875, which were completed the following month. On 21 February, the ship was placed in reserve for modifications to her armament.

The ship was recommissioned on 20 November 1875 and assigned to the Pacific station, departing for her overseas deployment on 17 February. In 1876, Seignelay and the cruisers Volta and Limier were sent to join the ironclad warship La Galissonnière and the cruiser Dayot off the coast of Peru to support a French archaeologist excavating the site at Ancon. The expedition found numerous artifacts, which were shipped to Tahiti aboard Limier. By 1877, the large vessels had returned home, leaving the just the old screw frigate Magicienne and the cruisers Dayot and Limier to patrol the station in company with Seignelay. Seignelay remained in the Pacific into 1878, by which time the ships assigned to the station included Magicienne, which was the flagship of the squadron, and the cruisers Beautemps-Beaupré, Segond, and Limier.

In January 1881, the ship was reclassified as an Éclaireur d'escadre (squadron scout). She was reclassified again in January 1885 as a Croiseur de 2^{e} classe (2nd-class cruiser). The following year, she received new boilers in Toulon.

In 1887, Seignelay had returned to France. She participated in the annual fleet maneuvers with the Mediterranean Squadron that year, which took place in April and May. The assembled fleet included nine ironclads, the new protected cruiser Sfax, and the unprotected cruisers Milan, Villars, Desaix and Dupetit-Thouars, the torpedo cruiser Condor, and several smaller vessels. The exercises were organized to test the practicality of using small torpedo boats to intercept a convoy in the open Mediterranean Sea, but the small craft proved to be incapable of operating far from shore.

By January 1889, Seignelay had been assigned to the Division Navale du Levant (Naval Division of the Levant) patrol the Levant in the eastern Mediterranean. The unit also included the old ironclad Vauban, the aviso Pétrel, and the gunboat Météore. While cruising off Jaffa in the Ottoman Empire on 26 April 1891, Seignelay ran aground. She was refloated on 1 May and then towed back to Toulon. She saw no further active service, and was struck from the naval register on 16 May 1892. She was then sold in August, but her ultimate fate is unknown.
