= French cruiser Dayot =

1860s French cruiser

- Dayot in Algiers in the 1880s

History

France
- Name: Dayot
- Builder: Ernest Goüin et Cie.
- Laid down: 19 November 1867
- Launched: 15 April 1869
- Commissioned: 24 June 1869
- Fate: Wrecked, 22 February 1888

General characteristics
- Class & type: Bourayne-class cruiser
- Displacement: 1,296.2 t (1,275.7 long tons; 1,428.8 short tons)
- Length: 65 m (213 ft 3 in) (loa)
- Beam: 10.42 m (34 ft 2 in)
- Draft: 4.915 m (16 ft 1.5 in) (maximum)
- Installed power: 2 × Scotch marine boilers; 900 to 1,200 ihp (670 to 890 kW)
- Propulsion: 1 × compound engine; 1 × screw propeller
- Sail plan: Barque
- Speed: 11.3 to 12.8 knots (20.9 to 23.7 km/h; 13.0 to 14.7 mph)
- Range: 2,950 nautical miles (5,460 km; 3,390 mi) at 10 kn (19 km/h; 12 mph)
- Complement: 154
- Armament: 1 × 194 mm (7.6 in) gun; 3 × 140 mm (5.5 in) guns; 1 × 138 mm (5.4 in) gun

Dayot (French: [dajo]) was an unprotected cruiser of the Bourayne class built for the French Navy in the late 1860s. The French initially attempted to mount a 194 mm (7.6 in) gun aboard the ship to improve their shore bombardment capability. Such a large gun proved to be too heavy, and it was instead replaced with a 164 mm (6.5 in) gun. Dayot served as a commerce raider during the Franco-Prussian War in 1870–1871, capturing three German vessels during the conflict. She then made two major overseas cruises to the Pacific Ocean, the first from 1874 to 1877, and the second from 1879 to 1882. A third deployment abroad took the ship to the Indian Ocean in 1887, and in Tamatave, Madagascar, in February 1888, Dayot was wrecked by a powerful cyclone and could not be salvaged.

== Design ==
The Bourayne class of unprotected cruiser was ordered as part of a major construction program to modernize the French cruising fleet. The ships were designed in the late 1860s; they were based on the earlier steam corvette Monge, but influenced by the armament adopted for the larger Sané-class cruisers. The Sané adopted an armament of just a few medium-caliber guns instead of a larger number of light weapons as had been used in older French cruisers. The French Navy wanted the new ships to be able to bombard coastal fortifications, which required the larger guns. A total of ten ships were ordered to the design.

=== Characteristics ===
Dayot was 65 m (213 ft 3 in) long overall, and she had a beam of 10.42 m (34 ft 2 in). She had an average draft of 4.33 m (14 ft 2 in) that was at most 4.915 m (16 ft 1.5 in) at the stern, and she displaced 1,296.2 t (1,275.7 long tons; 1,428.8 short tons). She had a wooden hull with a straight stem. Her normal crew numbered 154 officers and sailors.

The ship's propulsion system consisted of a single horizontal compound engine that drove a single screw propeller. Steam for the engine was provided by two coal-fired Scotch marine boilers, which were vented through a funnel located amidships. The propulsion system was designed to produce 920 indicated horsepower (690 kW) for a top speed of around 12 knots (22 km/h; 14 mph). In service, these figures varied between 900 to 1,200 ihp (670 to 890 kW) and speeds of 11.3 to 12.8 knots (20.9 to 23.7 km/h; 13.0 to 14.7 mph). Coal storage amounted to 186.7 t (183.8 long tons; 205.8 short tons), which allowed the ship to steam for up to 2,950 nautical miles (5,460 km; 3,390 mi) at a cruising speed of 10 knots (19 km/h; 12 mph). The ship was fitted with a three-masted barque rig to supplement the steam engine on long voyages abroad.

Dayot was completed with an armament that consisted of one 194 mm (7.6 in) rifled gun, three 140 mm (5.5 in) guns and one 138 mm (5.4 in) gun. By 1871, her 194 mm gun had been replaced with a 164 mm gun, the former having been deemed to be too heavy. The ship's weaponry was changed again in the mid-1870s, which then consisted of the 164 mm gun and five 138 mm (5.4 in) guns. In the 1880s, the 164 mm gun was also replaced with a 138 mm gun, and at least two 37 mm (1.5 in) Hotchkiss revolver cannon were added.

== Service history ==
=== Construction and first Pacific cruise ===
Dayot was laid down at the Ernest Goüin et Cie. shipyard in Nantes on 19 November 1867. Her completed hull was launched on 15 April 1869. The ship was placed in limited commission on 24 June for sea trials, which were completed in April 1870. At that time, Dayot was placed in full commission. At some point thereafter, she was moved to Lorient, and in 1870, the French Navy considered converting her to a mortar ship, but the idea came to nothing. During the Franco-Prussian War, she operated as a commerce raider. On 9 August, she captured the German vessel Lannia and towed her to Le Havre. captured the Prussian brig Agnes on 26 September and seized her as contraband. The German government later protested the act as illegal, since Agnes had sailed before the declaration (and thus was exempt from seizure under established French rules) and she was carrying goods to France. Dayot also captured the Prussian ship Graf von Krassow, which was ruled to be a legitimate seizure. Dayot captured a third vessel, Laura Louise, which was also deemed a legitimate action, though part of the cargo was ruled to be protected and had to be returned to the owners. The war with what was now unified Germany ended on 28 January 1871 with the Armistice of Versailles. Dayot was decommissioned at Lorient on 5 April 1871.

The ship was next recommissioned on 27 August 1874 for a cruise in the Pacific Ocean. When she arrived, the Division navale de l'Ocean Pacifique (Naval Division of the Pacific Ocean) also included the ironclad warship La Galissonnière, the cruisers Vaudreuil and Infernet, and the aviso Bruat. A third cruiser, L'Hermitte, was wrecked that year at Wallis. Vaudreuil and Bruat left soon thereafter, however. In 1876, Dayot and La Galissonnière sailed to Peru, where their crews assisted a French archaeologist excavating at Ancon. Other French vessels joined them there, including the cruisers Volta, Limier, and Seignelay. The expedition found numerous artifacts, which were shipped to Tahiti aboard Limier. By 1877, the large vessels had returned home, leaving the just the old screw frigate Magicienne and the cruisers Seignelay and Limier to patrol the station in company with Dayot. In 1877, while on a cruise from Tahiti to Batavia in the Dutch East Indies, Dayot encountered the British vessel Somerset, which had run aground on a coral reef. The French sailors were able to refloat Somerset. Dayot arrived back in France on 7 October 1877.

=== Second Pacific deployment ===
In 1879, Dayot had returned for another deployment to the Pacific station, being sent to reinforce the French Pacific squadron in response to the outbreak of the War of the Pacific between Chile, Peru, and Bolivia. The French squadron gathered in Callao, Chile, to observe the fighting and protect French interests in the region, along with warships from Britain, Germany, and the United States. Dayot traveled around South America before arriving in Chile. While passing through Mangareva in the Gambier Islands, Dayot lightly touched bottom, but was not damaged. She stayed in Mangareva for two months before sailing to Tahiti, where her hull was cleaned. At the time the ship arrived on the Pacific station, the unit was commanded by Rear Admiral Abel-Nicolas Bergasse du Petit-Thouars from his flagship, the ironclad Victorieuse; along with Dayot, the squadron included the screw corvette Decrès, and the avisos Hussard and Chasseur. In response to unrest in the Marquesas Islands in French Polynesia that year, Dayot carried the colonial official Emmanuel Ruault and a battery of artillery to Taioha'e on the island of Nuku Hiva in May 1880 to await further reinforcements. Other French forces gathered to suppress the fighting in the Marquesas. Dayot was soon joined there by Victorieuse and Chasseur, which brought additional soldiers.

Beginning in August, she sailed from Tahiti to visit several islands in the central and south Pacific, including Papeete and Nouméa. While passing Scilly on 20 August, her lookouts spotted a wrecked barque Concordia, which had run aground on the reef. Dayot stopped to search for survivors, but found none. From there, Dayot sailed on to Suwarrow, where she grounded lightly on a sandbar near the entrance to the lagoon, but she was soon freed and entered the harbor. The ship was not seriously damaged in the accident, though her false keel was gouged and some sections of her copper sheathing had been torn away. The crew spent two days at Suwarrow making repairs to the ship before continuing on to Pago Pago. There, she met the American sloop of war USS Alaska, among other vessels; the Americans maintained a coaling station there, and they permitted Dayot to replenish her coal supplies The French cruiser departed on 1 September for Apia, where she encountered the German gunboat SMS Hyäne. On 5 September, she departed for Wallis, arriving there two days later. Dayot then moved to Futuna, passing the wreck of L'Hermitte on the way. By 21 September, Dayot reached Nouméa, where she met the cruiser D'Estrées and three small gunboats.

In 1881, the cruiser Éclaireur arrived to relieve Dayot. Dayot returned home by sailing around South America. She stopped in Valparaíso, Chile, in January 1882 and reached Punta Arenas by 12 February, thereafter passing through the Strait of Magellan before stopping for several days at Montevideo, Uruguay. The ship got underway again on 2 March, and eventually reached Lorient on 5 May. After returning home, she was taken into drydock to be reboilered; the work continued into 1883.

=== Indian Ocean and fate ===
Dayot wrecked at Tamatave

Dayot had been recommissioned and deployed to the Indian Ocean station by 1887, serving along with the cruisers Vaudreuil and D'Estaing and the gunboats Chacal, Tirailleuse, and Redoute. In early 1888, Dayot received orders to return home; by that time, her boilers were worn out and she could only make 5 knots (9.3 km/h; 5.8 mph) at full power. While the ship was at Tamatave, Madagascar, on 22 February, a powerful cyclone drove her aground and sank her in shallow water. One man died when he panicked and jumped into the sea, but he was the sole casualty. Several other ships were sunk in the storm. Unable to be salvaged, Dayot was struck from the naval register on 21 April.
