= French cruiser Magon =

French naval vessel of the 1880s

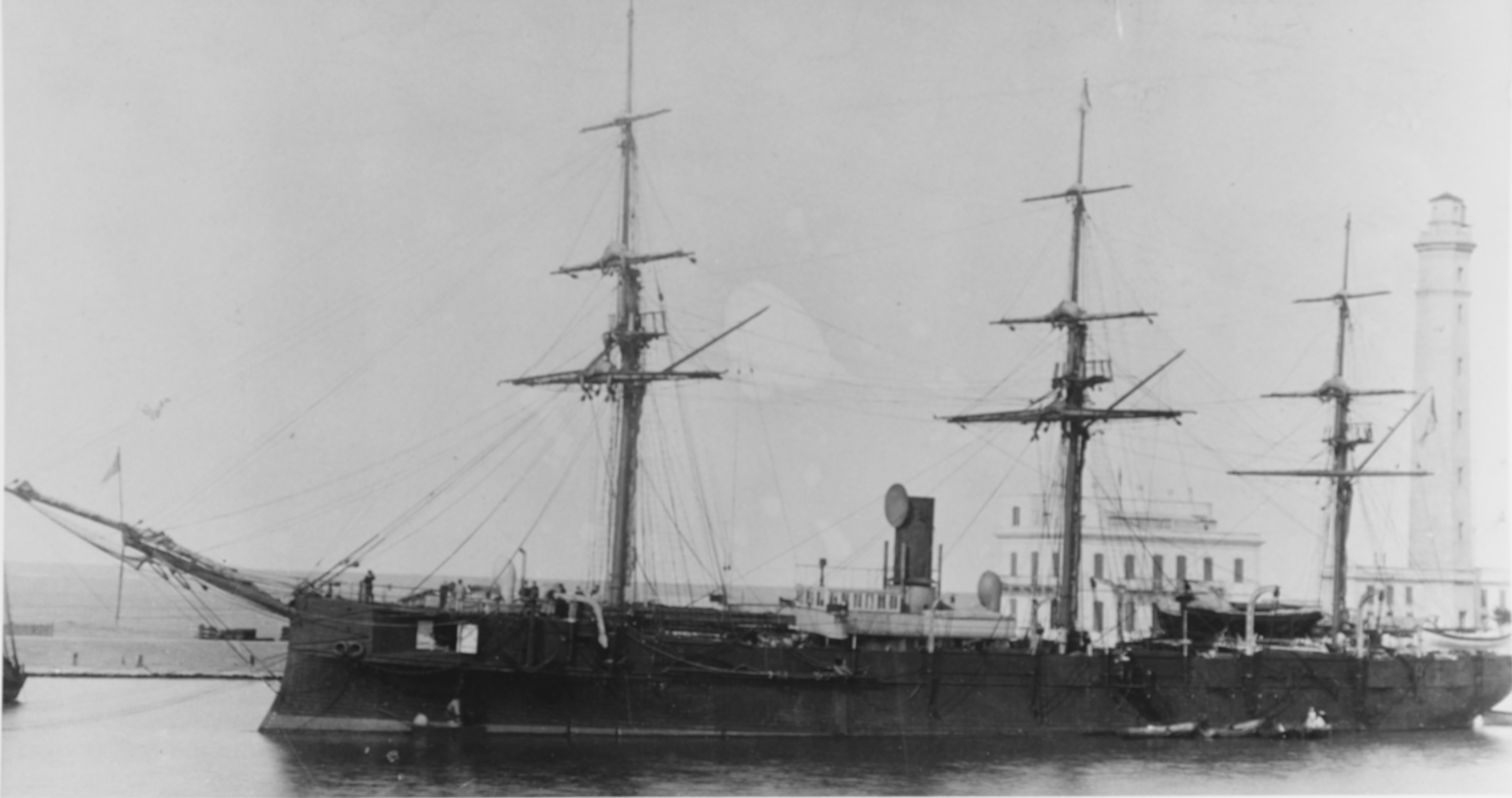
- Magon, date unknown

History

France
- Name: Magon
- Builder: Arsenal de Cherbourg
- Laid down: 18 April 1876
- Launched: 9 August 1880
- Commissioned: 1 July 1882
- Stricken: 19 December 1895
- Fate: Sold for scrap, 17 July 1896

General characteristics
- Class & type: Villars-class cruiser
- Displacement: 2,419 t (2,381 long tons)
- Length: 74.27 m (243 ft 8 in) lwl
- Beam: 11.6 m (38 ft 1 in)
- Draft: 5.31 m (17 ft 5 in)
- Installed power: 6 × fire-tube boilers; 2,700 ihp (2,000 kW)
- Propulsion: 1 × compound steam engine; 1 × screw propeller
- Sail plan: Full ship rig
- Speed: 14.6 knots (27.0 km/h; 16.8 mph)
- Range: 4,810 nmi (8,910 km; 5,540 mi) at 10 knots (19 km/h; 12 mph)
- Complement: 269
- Armament: 15 × 138.6 mm (5.46 in) guns; 2 × 37 mm (1.5 in) Hotchkiss revolver cannon

Magon was an unprotected cruiser of the Villars class built for the French Navy in the 1870s. The ships were designed for service in the French colonial empire, and they carried a relatively heavy battery of fifteen 138.6 mm (5.46 in) guns, and could steam at a speed of 14.5 knots (26.9 km/h; 16.7 mph). The ship was laid down in 1876 and was completed in 1882. In 1884, she was deployed to East Asia during the Sino-French War, along with several other vessels, but by the time she arrived, the war had ended. Magon was sent to the Pacific Ocean thereafter, eventually returning to France by 1890. She served in the North Atlantic Squadron in 1893 and 1894, before being struck from the naval register in 1895. She was sold for scrap the following year.

== Design ==
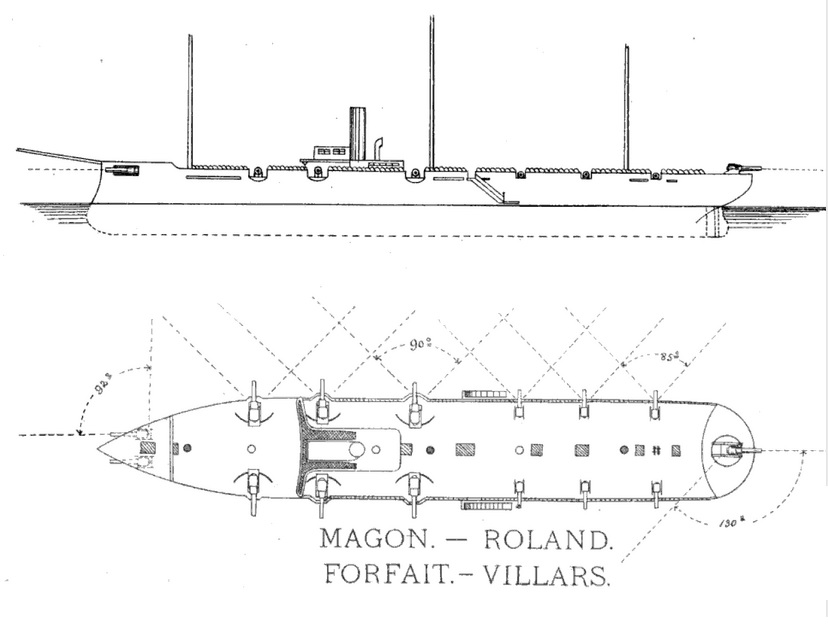
Plan and profile view of the Villars class

The four ships of the Villars class were ordered under the auspices of the naval plan of 1872, which was laid out to modernize the French Navy in the aftermath of the Franco-Prussian War of 1870–1871. The navy sought new unprotected cruisers that carried a heavier armament than earlier vessels, while maintaining a similar size to keep costs from increasing during a period of limited naval budgets. The design for the ships was drawn up by Victorin Sabattier. The vessels were intended to serve overseas in the French colonial empire.

Magon was 74.27 m (243 ft 8 in) long at the waterline, with a beam of 11.6 m (38 ft 1 in) and an average draft of 5.3 m (17 ft 5 in). She displaced 2,419 t (2,381 long tons; 2,666 short tons) as designed. The ship had a ram bow and an overhanging stern. Her crew amounted to 269 officers and enlisted men. The ship's propulsion system consisted of a single compound steam engine driving a screw propeller. Steam was provided by six coal-burning fire-tube boilers that were ducted into a single funnel. Her machinery was rated to produce 2,700 indicated horsepower (2,000 kW) for a top speed of 14.5 knots (26.9 km/h; 16.7 mph). At a more economical speed of 10 knots (19 km/h; 12 mph), the ship could steam for 4,810 nautical miles (8,910 km; 5,540 mi).

The ship was armed with a main battery of fifteen 138.6 mm (5.46 in) M1870M 21.3-caliber guns. Two were placed in the forecastle, firing through embrasures as chase guns, one was atop the stern, and the remainder were placed in an amidships battery on the upper deck, six guns per broadside. Of the broadside guns, the forward three on each side were placed in sponsons, while the remaining three guns were in pivot mounts firing through embrasures. A pair of 37 mm (1.5 in) Hotchkiss revolver cannon provided close-range defense against torpedo boats. She also carried a pair of 86.5 mm (3.41 in) bronze mountain guns or a single 65 mm (2.6 in) field gun that could be sent ashore with a landing party.

== Service history ==
Magon was laid down at the Arsenal de Cherbourg (Cherbourg Naval Base) on 18 April 1876, and she was launched on 9 August 1880. She was commissioned to begin sea trials on 1 July 1882, which included full-power tests on 31 August. Her trials were completed shortly thereafter, and she was placed in the 2nd category of reserve on 9 September. The ship was reactivated around December 1884 for a deployment to East Asia. She departed from Cherbourg on 31 December to begin her voyage overseas. The ship sent to reinforce the Escadre de l'Extrême-Orient (Far East Squadron), along with the ironclad warship Turenne and the cruisers Roland, Primauguet, Limier, and Hugon, and several gunboats and smaller craft. The ships departed Brest on 21 February and stopped in Algiers, French Algeria, on 3 March while en route. By 25 April, they had arrived on station in French Indochina, though a preliminary peace agreement had already been signed on 4 April, so the ships saw no action during the war.

Magon remained in East Asia only briefly before moving to the Pacific Station along with the unprotected cruiser Fabert. The following year, the two cruisers were joined on the Pacific Station by the cruisers Bourayne and Decrès. By 1887, Magon had returned home to be decommissioned. The ship had returned to active service by 1890, though she was not assigned to an active formation. The following year, she was reduced to the 3rd category of reserve.

The following year, she was sent to patrol the West Indies. In December, she was at Martinique, where she met the Dutch cruiser HNLMS De Ruyter. In January 1892, Magon was joined there by the cruiser Naïade and the aviso Hussard. In August and September, Magon, De Ruyter, the German corvette Arcona, the Spanish sloop Jorge Juan, and the British screw corvettes HMS Canada and Pylades cruised off the coast of Venezuela to observe the political situation there. During the unrest in Venezuela, locals had attacked European nationals, and the international squadron that had assembled to ensure the situation did not escalate. In 1893, she was assigned to the North Atlantic squadron, which included the unprotected cruisers Aréthuse and Segond and the aviso Hussard. In 1894, she visited Brazil, which was then in the midst of the Revolta da Armada (Naval Revolts); the rebel Admiral Saldanha da Gama fled in the aftermath of a defeat and boarded Magon to flee the country. She remained in the unit through most of the year, before being relieved by Roland in September. Magon was eventually struck from the naval register on 19 December 1895. She was sold on 17 July 1896 to ship breakers in Brest, France, to be scrapped.
