= French cruiser Vaudreuil =

1860s French cruiser

- Vaudreuil in Algiers on 28 August 1885

History

France
- Name: Vaudreuil
- Builder: Arsenal de Lorient
- Laid down: 24 January 1868
- Launched: 26 August 1870
- Commissioned: 1 March 1871
- Stricken: 27 June 1889
- Fate: Broken up, 1917

General characteristics
- Class & type: Bourayne-class cruiser
- Displacement: 1,296.2 t (1,275.7 long tons; 1,428.8 short tons)
- Length: 65 m (213 ft 3 in) (loa)
- Beam: 10.42 m (34 ft 2 in)
- Draft: 4.915 m (16 ft 1.5 in) (maximum)
- Installed power: 2 × Scotch marine boilers; 900 to 1,200 ihp (670 to 890 kW)
- Propulsion: 1 × compound engine; 1 × screw propeller
- Sail plan: Barque
- Speed: 11.3 to 12.8 knots (20.9 to 23.7 km/h; 13.0 to 14.7 mph)
- Range: 2,950 nautical miles (5,460 km; 3,390 mi) at 10 kn (19 km/h; 12 mph)
- Complement: 154
- Armament: 1 × 194 mm (7.6 in) gun; 3 × 140 mm (5.5 in) guns

Vaudreuil was an unprotected cruiser of the Bourayne class built for the French Navy in the late 1860s. The French initially attempted to mount a 194 mm (7.6 in) gun aboard the ship to improve their shore bombardment capability. Such a large gun proved to be too heavy, and it was instead replaced with a 164 mm (6.5 in) gun. After entering service in 1871, Vaudreuil was sent abroad to the Pacific Ocean, which she patrolled until 1874. Her next overseas cruise took her to the South Atlantic from 1878 to 1882. The following year, the ship was sent to Madagascar as part of the First Madagascar expedition, which sought to enforce French colonial claims over the island. Vaudreuil saw heavy action during the operations, both in bombarding enemy forces and sending landing parties ashore to seize coastal towns. The ship returned to France in 1886, but was sent back to Madagascar in 1887. After being struck from the naval register in 1889, she was used to store coal in Lorient until 1917, when she was broken up.

== Design ==
The Bourayne class of unprotected cruiser was ordered as part of a major construction program to modernize the French cruising fleet. They were designed in the late 1860s; the ships were based on the earlier steam corvette Monge, but influenced by the armament adopted for the larger Sané-class cruisers. The Sané adopted an armament of just a few medium-caliber guns instead of a larger number of light weapons as had been used in older French cruisers. The French Navy wanted the new ships to be able to bombard coastal fortifications, which required the larger guns. A total of ten ships were ordered to the design.

=== Characteristics ===
Vaudreuil was 65 m (213 ft 3 in) long overall, and she had a beam of 10.42 m (34 ft 2 in). She had an average draft of 4.33 m (14 ft 2 in) that was at most 4.915 m (16 ft 1.5 in) at the stern, and she displaced 1,296.2 t (1,275.7 long tons; 1,428.8 short tons). She had a wooden hull with a straight stem. Her normal crew numbered 154 officers and sailors.

The ship's propulsion system consisted of a single horizontal compound engine that drove a single screw propeller. Steam for the engine was provided by two coal-fired Scotch marine boilers, which were vented through a funnel located amidships. The propulsion system was designed to produce 920 indicated horsepower (690 kW) for a top speed of around 12 knots (22 km/h; 14 mph). In service, these figures varied between 900 to 1,200 ihp (670 to 890 kW) and speeds of 11.3 to 12.8 knots (20.9 to 23.7 km/h; 13.0 to 14.7 mph). Coal storage amounted to 186.7 t (183.8 long tons; 205.8 short tons), which allowed the ship to steam for up to 2,950 nautical miles (5,460 km; 3,390 mi) at a cruising speed of 10 knots (19 km/h; 12 mph). The ship was fitted with a three-masted barque rig to supplement the steam engine on long voyages abroad.

Vaudreuil was completed with an armament that consisted of one 194 mm (7.6 in) rifled gun and three 140 mm (5.5 in) guns. The ship's weaponry was changed in the mid-1870s, and at that time the 194 mm gun was replaced by a 164 mm gun. The lighter guns were also superseded by five 138 mm (5.4 in) guns and one 100 mm (3.9 in) gun. In the 1880s, the 164 mm gun was also replaced with a 138 mm gun, and at least two 37 mm (1.5 in) Hotchkiss revolver cannon were added.

== Service history ==
Vaudreuil was laid down at the Arsenal de Lorient shipyard in Lorient on 24 January 1868, and her completed hull was launched on 26 August 1870. She was commissioned on a limited capacity to begin sea trials on 1 March 1871. Initial testing was completed later that month. Vaudreuil was then sent abroad to cruise the Pacific Ocean, protecting French commercial interests in the region. At the time, French cruisers in the region alternated between patrolling the islands of Oceania and visiting ports along the Pacific coast of South America. In July 1872, Vaudreuil arrived in Apia, Samoa, where she embarked the local Catholic missionary for a tour of other islands in the region, including Wallis, Futuna, Rotuma, and Ovalau. From there, she cruised to New Caledonia. In November 1873, Vaudreuil was in Valparaíso, Chile, where she was joined by the cruiser L'Hermitte. The two cruisers then sailed south to visit Coronel and take on coal. By 1874, the Division navale de l'Ocean Pacifique (Naval Division of the Pacific Ocean) also included the ironclad warships La Galissonnière and Atalante, the cruisers L'Hermitte and Infernet, and the aviso Bruat. In early 1874, Vaudreuil returned home and was decommissioned on 5 April.

Another deployment abroad followed in 1878; she was recommissioned on 20 January and assigned to the South Atlantic station. She patrolled the region for the next two years before returning home. By 1880, the French squadron in the region consisted of the screw frigate Vénus, Vaudreuil, the cruiser Talisman, the aviso Boursaint, the gunboat Tactique, and the armed transport Loiret. Vaudreuil had returned home by 1882, when she received new boilers to replace her worn-out boilers.

=== Madagascar campaign ===
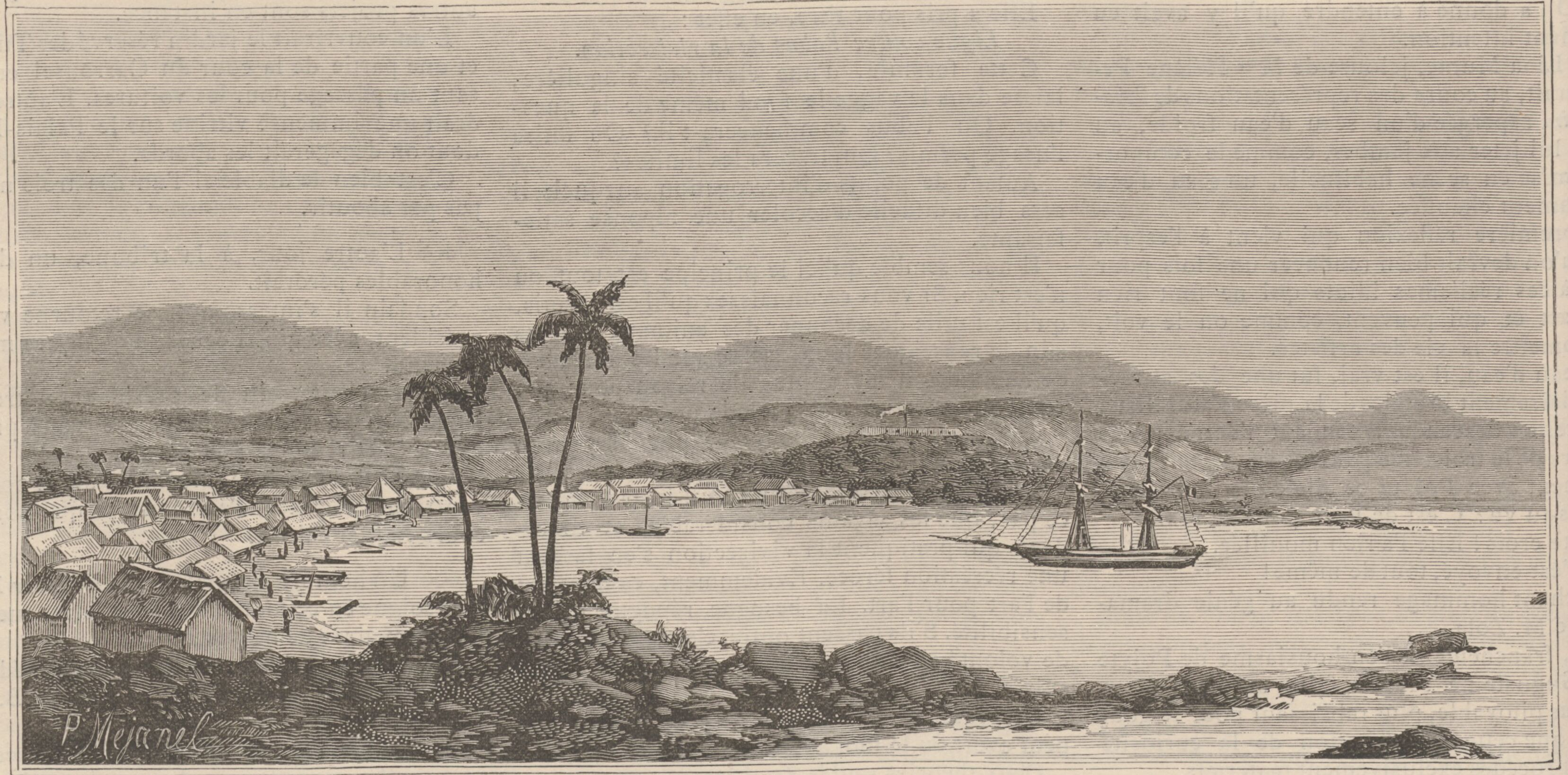
Sketch of Tamatave during the First Madagascar expedition

By April 1883, Vaudreuil had joined a squadron off the coast of Madagascar that included the cruisers Forfait and Beautemps-Beaupré, the screw frigate Flore, the aviso Boursaint, and the gunboat Picque. The squadron was commanded by Admiral Pierre Pierre. On 7 May, Pierre sent Forfait to Tamatave while he took the rest of his squadron to the Ampasindava Peninsula, where he started the First Madagascar expedition by bombarding government positions there. Vaudreuil and the other ships attacked coastal fortifications at four towns in the area, driving off the garrisons, and sending men ashore to destroy the forts. The French then moved to Majunga on 15 May to begin the next phase of campaign. The next morning, Vaudreuil and the other ships anchored some 1,800 m (5,900 ft) from the two fortifications that defended Majunga, and opened a slow bombardment, firing one shell per ship every two minutes. After a few hours, the garrisons fled, abandoning some thirty artillery pieces, and Vaudreuil and Pique briefly sailed north to complete the bombardment from another angle. A landing party from the ships was then sent ashore to seize Majunga, commanded by Captain Gaillard, the captain of Vaudreuil.

The landing party, consisting of some 80 naval infantry and another 10 artillerymen who operated a 65 mm (2.6 in) gun, a 40 mm (1.6 in) gun, and three of the captured guns, occupied one of the forts. To support the small garrison, Pierre left Vaudreuil and Picque there to guard the town while he took the rest of the squadron to join Forfait at Tamatave, where on 1 June he issued an ultimatum, which the Merina government rejected on 9 June. The next day, the French consul in Tamatave boarded Forfait, after which Pierre bombarded the city. On 12 November, Vaudreuil and the armed transport Nièvre sailed to southern Madagascar and shelled Merina positions at Mahela, Mananjara, and Fort Dauphin. Vaudreuil then sailed on alone, circling the island and bombarding any hostile forces she encountered along the way back to Tamatave. In addition, her crew gathered information on the attitudes of local towns to determine if they would support a revolt against Merina rule, though the results did not encourage further French action.

Fighting continued on the island through 1884 and 1885, though Vaudreuil was not involved in any major operations; instead, she was sent home to France in February 1884. She had returned to Madagascar by the summer, and in August, she was sent to Zanzibar to receive instructions for French representatives negotiating a settlement. A peace treaty was finally signed on 17 December 1885. Vaudreuil remained on the Indian Ocean station as of 31 January 1886,, but later that year, Vaudreuil was no longer assigned to the Indian Ocean station.

=== Later career ===
In 1887, Vaudreuil returned to the Indian Ocean station, serving along with the cruisers Dayot and D'Estaing and the gunboats Chacal, Tirailleuse, and Redoute. Vaudreuil was eventually struck from the naval register on 27 June 1889. She was initially used as a coal storage hulk in Lorient, a role she filled through 1917. During this period, she was moved from her normal position on 30 December 1915 so the river could be dredged before being moved back on 18 January 1916. Vaudreuil was condemned on 25 July 1917 and was broken up in Lorient by shipyard workers and German prisoners of war.
