= French cruiser Bourayne =

1860s French cruiser

- Bourayne in Algiers

History

France
- Name: Bourayne
- Builder: Ernest Goüin et Cie.
- Laid down: 19 November 1867
- Launched: 29 May 1869
- Commissioned: 1 June 1869
- Decommissioned: 1887
- Stricken: 27 June 1889

General characteristics
- Class & type: Bourayne-class cruiser
- Displacement: 1,296.2 t (1,275.7 long tons; 1,428.8 short tons)
- Length: 65 m (213 ft 3 in) (loa)
- Beam: 10.42 m (34 ft 2 in)
- Draft: 4.915 m (16 ft 1.5 in) (maximum)
- Installed power: 2 × Scotch marine boilers; 900 to 1,200 ihp (670 to 890 kW)
- Propulsion: 1 × compound engine; 1 × screw propeller
- Sail plan: Barque
- Speed: 11.3 to 12.8 knots (20.9 to 23.7 km/h; 13.0 to 14.7 mph)
- Range: 2,950 nautical miles (5,460 km; 3,390 mi) at 10 kn (19 km/h; 12 mph)
- Complement: 154
- Armament: As completed: 1 × 194 mm (7.6 in) gun; 3 × 140 mm (5.5 in) guns; 1871 refit: 1 × 164 mm (6.5 in) gun; 3 × 140 mm guns

Bourayne was the lead ship of the Bourayne class of unprotected cruisers built for the French Navy in the late 1860s. The French initially attempted to mount a 194 mm (7.6 in) gun aboard the ships to improve their shore bombardment capability. Such a large gun proved to be too heavy, and it was instead replaced with a 164 mm (6.5 in) gun. The ship spent much of her existence out of service, being activated for three major overseas deployments, the first two to East Asia, from 1871 to 1874 and from 1877 to 1879, respectively. Bourayne battled Chinese pirates off the coast of Tonkin during the first deployment in 1872, her only major combat operation. The third voyage, from 1886 to 1887, took the ship to the Pacific station. The ship was struck from the naval register in 1889 and hulked in Lorient, France; she was used to store coal until 1914, and then used as a barracks ship from 1920 to 1922. Bourayne was placed for sale in 1929, but her ultimate fate is unknown.

== Design ==
The Bourayne class of unprotected cruiser was ordered as part of a major construction program to modernize the French cruising fleet. The ships were designed in the late 1860s; they were based on the earlier steam corvette Monge, but influenced by the armament for the larger Sané-class cruisers. The Sané adopted an armament of just a few medium-caliber guns instead of a larger number of light weapons as had been used in older French cruisers. The French Navy wanted the new ships to be able to bombard coastal fortifications, which required the larger guns. A total of ten ships were ordered to the design.

=== Characteristics ===
Bourayne was 65 m (213 ft 3 in) long overall, and she had a beam of 10.42 m (34 ft 2 in). She had an average draft of 4.33 m (14 ft 2 in) that was at most 4.915 m (16 ft 1.5 in) at the stern, and she displaced 1,296.2 t (1,275.7 long tons; 1,428.8 short tons). She had a wooden hull with a straight stem. Her normal crew numbered 154 officers and sailors.

The ship's propulsion system consisted of a single horizontal compound engine that drove a single screw propeller. Steam for the engine was provided by two coal-fired Scotch marine boilers, which were vented through a funnel located amidships. The propulsion system was designed to produce 920 indicated horsepower (690 kW) for a top speed of around 12 knots (22 km/h; 14 mph). In service, these figures varied between 900 to 1,200 ihp (670 to 890 kW) and speeds of 11.3 to 12.8 knots (20.9 to 23.7 km/h; 13.0 to 14.7 mph). Coal storage amounted to 186.7 t (183.8 long tons; 205.8 short tons), which allowed the ship to steam for up to 2,950 nautical miles (5,460 km; 3,390 mi) at a cruising speed of 10 knots (19 km/h; 12 mph). The ship was fitted with a three-masted barque rig to supplement the steam engine on long voyages abroad.

Bourayne was completed with an armament that consisted of one 194 mm (7.6 in) rifled gun and two 164 m (538 ft) M1864 guns, but shortly after she entered service in 1869, her armament was revised to the 194 mm gun and three 140 mm (5.5 in) guns. The 194 mm gun was on a rotating platform located forward. By 1871, her 194 mm gun had been replaced with a 164 mm gun, the former having been deemed to be too heavy. The ship's weaponry was changed again in the mid-1870s, which then consisted of the 164 mm gun and five 138 mm (5.4 in) guns; of the latter, two were located on each broadside, with the last at the stern. In the 1880s, the 164 mm gun was also replaced with a 138 mm gun, and at least two 37 mm (1.5 in) Hotchkiss revolver cannon were added.

== Service history ==
Bourayne was laid down at the Ernest Goüin et Cie. shipyard in Nantes on 19 November 1867. Her completed hull was launched on 29 May 1869, and was commissioned in a limited capacity just a few days later, on 1 June, to begin sea trials. These were completed by July 1870, when she was placed in full commission. Following the outbreak of the Franco-Prussian War that month, Bourayne was sent into the Baltic Sea with other French warships. She stopped in Aarhus, Denmark, on 23 August, and by 30 August, she had moved north to Frederikshavn, Denmark. She was joined there by the ironclad warships Armide and Rochambeau that day. Bourayne had moved to the Danish capital at Copenhagen the following month, and on 16 September, she sailed to Helsingfors, Russia.

=== Deployment to Asia, 1871–1874 ===
Top: Illustration of Bourayne sinking a pirate junk
Bottom: Bourayne driving a junk ashore.

In early 1871, Bourayne departed for Toulon in the Mediterranean Sea, arriving there on 23 March. She was decommissioned there on 4 April, but she soon returned to service, being recommissioned on 2 October. Bourayne soon departed for East Asian waters to protect French interests in the region, particularly in Cochinchina. On 23 January 1872, Bourayne sailed from Saigon to conduct a survey of the Gulf of Tonkin, stopping to visit Tourane on the way. She later stopped in Haiphong, where her commander, Capitaine de frégate (frigate captain) Vincent-François-Émilien Senez, traveled up the Cấm River aboard one of the ship's launches. While surveying Cát Bà Island in February, Bourayne found several pirate junks, which fled to the safety of a harbor on the island. Bourayne managed to capture one of the vessels and drive another ashore before they escaped. In July, Bourayne embarked Norodom, the king of Cambodia, for a tour of Hong Kong, Macao, and Canton in China and Manila in the Spanish Philippines.

In October 1872, Bourayne was ordered to Haiphong; she sailed from Saigon on 5 October. While on the way north, she encountered several local pirate junks, which she destroyed in three actions over the span of a week. The first battle took place on 21 October, she was attacked by two junks, but Bourayne soon forced the crew of one junk to abandon their vessel and then sank the second pirate ship. The action lasted about two hours, and Bourayne received several damaging hits to her hull and rigging, and two men were wounded; the French killed some 300 pirates between the two junks.

On 27 October, Bourayne found a small pirate flotilla of four junks. Upon sighting the French cruiser, the junks divided into pairs to attack Bourayne. In the span of 15 minutes, she sank the first pair of junks. The French then turned their attention to the other pair, which they severely damaged. The junks ran themselves aground to avoid sinking, so Bourayne sent men ashore to seize them. One junk was burned on the shore and the other was dragged into deep water, where it was scuttled. Bourayne remained there overnight, and the next day another pirate junk arrived, mistakenly interpreting the burning ship to be a signal to join the battle. Bourayne sank that ship as well. In the actions on 27 and 28 October, a further five men were wounded, bringing the total of French casualties to seven. Bourayne also received more damage to her hull and rigging. Some 500 pirates were killed between the three battles, and 100 cannon were either captured or sunk. Senez was later promoted to the rank of capitaine de vaisseau (ship-of-the-line captain) for his actions during the fighting.

The ship nevertheless continued her voyage and arrived at the mouth of the Cấm River on 30 October. She was sent there to protect a commercial arms shipment to a Chinese garrison in neighboring Yunnan, which was to be sent upriver to Hanoi and then up the Red River. While Bourayne waited for the traders to complete their voyage from Hong Kong, Senez traveled to Hanoi to survey the branches of the river in the area. In the meantime, the traders arrived on 9 November, but then sailed further south to explore other entrances to the Red River. The traders arrived back at the Cấm River on 18 November and began the voyage upriver, at which point Bourayne was no longer needed. She departed two days later. Bourayne's battles with pirates were widely publicized in France, and were used as justifications for further imperialist activities in the region.

By early 1874, the French naval forces in the region consisted of the ironclad Belliqueuse, Bourayne, the screw corvette Cosmao, and a gunboat, though all of these ships were replaced over the course of 1874, Bourayne being relieved by the corvette Decrès. After arriving back in France, Bourayne was decommissioned on 16 October 1874.

=== Later career ===
Bourayne next returned to service on 10 February 1877 for another deployment to Cochinchina. As of 1878, the unit consisted of the stationary flagship Tilsitt, the cruiser Duchaffault, the aviso Antilope, and eight gunboats. Bourayne's assignment to Indochina lasted until 1879. The ship remained out of service for the next decade, seeing little activity beyond periodic refits and alterations to her armament in the 1880s. In 1886, she was activated for a deployment to the Pacific station, which also included the cruisers Duquesne, Magon, Decrès, and Fabert. By 1887, Bourayne was no longer listed among the active ships of the French fleet.

She was eventually struck from the naval register on 27 June 1889 and reduced to a hulk in Lorient. She remained in that role into 1890, when she was converted into a coal storage hulk. She remained in use until 1914. In 1920, Bourayne was converted into a barracks ship, but served in that capacity for just two years, when she was hulked again. She was eventually placed for sale on 10 July 1929. The details of her disposal are unrecorded.
