= Bourayne-class cruiser =

- Bourayne in Algiers

Class overview
- Preceded by: Sané class
- Succeeded by: Hirondelle
- Subclasses: Duchaffault class
- Built: 1867–1874
- Completed: 10
- Lost: 1
- Scrapped: 9

General characteristics
- Displacement: 1,296.2 t (1,275.7 long tons; 1,428.8 short tons)
- Length: 65 m (213 ft 3 in) (loa)
- Beam: 10.42 m (34 ft 2 in)
- Draft: 4.915 m (16 ft 1.5 in) (maximum)
- Installed power: 2 × Scotch marine boilers; 900 to 1,200 ihp (670 to 890 kW)
- Propulsion: 1 × compound engine; 1 × screw propeller
- Sail plan: Barque rig
- Speed: 11.3 to 12.8 knots (20.9 to 23.7 km/h; 13.0 to 14.7 mph)
- Range: 2,950 nmi (5,460 km; 3,390 mi) at 10 kn (19 km/h; 12 mph)
- Complement: 154
- Armament: Bourayne class; 1 × 194 mm (7.6 in) gun; 3 × 140 mm (5.5 in) guns; Hugon and Beautemps-Beaupré; 1 × 164 mm (6.5 in) gun; 5 × 138 mm (5.4 in) guns; Duchaffault subclass; 6 × 138 mm (5.4 in) guns

The Bourayne class was a group of ten unprotected cruisers built for the French Navy in the 1860s and 1870s. The class comprised ten ships: Bourayne, Segond, Dayot, Ducouëdic, Kersaint, Vaudreuil, Hugon, Beautemps-Beaupré, Duchaffault, (Note: Duchaffault's name was incorrectly recorded as "Duchaffaut" in official records until 12 May 1887 when the French Navy corrected the mistake.) and Kerguélen. The last two vessels were completed to a slightly different design, and are sometimes considered to be a separate sub-class. The Bourayne-class ships were ordered as part of a naval modernization program begun in the 1850s; their design was largely based on the steam corvette Monge, but also influenced by the larger Sané-class cruisers. Armament of the Bouraynes was planned to consist of a large 194 mm (7.6 in) gun and two 164 mm (6.5 in) guns. In practice, the armament varied between ships, owing in large part due to experience with the initial ships that demonstrated that the 194 mm gun was too heavy, so several different combinations of guns were tried. By the 1880s, all ten ships had standardized on a uniform battery of six 138 mm (5.4 in) guns.

Four members of the class—Bourayne, Segond, Dayot, and Ducouëdic—were completed in time to see some service related to the Franco-Prussian War of 1870–1871, with Segond and Dayot operating as commerce raiders that attached German merchant shipping. As French attention turned to expanding its colonial empire in the 1870s, the Bourayne-class cruisers saw extensive service abroad, helping to establish and then patrol the country's colonial holdings. These included frequent deployments to Southeast Asia and the Pacific. The two most significant actions during this period both took place between 1883 and 1885: the First Madagascar expedition and the Tonkin campaign, which caused the Sino-French War. Members of the class saw extensive service in both conflicts, including bombarding enemy positions ashore and enforcing blockades.

By the mid- to late 1880s, the French began withdrawing ships of the class, starting with Kersaint in 1884. Dayot was sunk by a typhoon in Madagascar in 1888, the only member of the class to be lost in service. Vaudreuil and Bourayne were both decommissioned in 1889. The rest of the class was decommissioned in a second wave between 1894 and 1897, with most ships being used in subsidiary roles. The last-surviving ship, Bourayne, lingered on as a storage hulk until 1929.

== Design ==
In 1855, the French Navy drew up plans to modernize its cruising fleet, including thirty 1st-class steam corvettes and thirty 1st-class avisos. Seven ships of the latter category were built between the late 1850s and early 1860s. (Note: These included Talisman, the five members of the Hamelin class, and Linois.) The naval engineer Jean-Baptiste Pastoureau-Labesse prepared the design for the Bourayne class, based largely on the steam corvette Monge. His proposal was approved on 13 August 1867, but Henri Dupuy de Lôme made several alterations following Pastoureau-Labesse's departure from the navy in August 1868. The new cruiser design followed the pattern set by the larger vessels of the Sané class, which had adopted a smaller number of larger guns over the traditional numerous but light armament of earlier cruisers. The intention was to allow even small cruisers to effectively engage coastal fortifications.

Two ships were authorized for the 1867 fiscal year, with four more added in the 1868 budget. The final tranche of four ships were authorized in 1869. During construction, two ships—Duchaffault and Kerguélen—were altered slightly, becoming a subclass. The changes were ordered by Prosper de Chasseloup-Laubat, the French naval minister, who requested a new design based around a more powerful engine from Indret. The naval engineers at the Arsenal de Cherbourg submitted a proposal for a ship based on the cruiser D'Estrées, though by that time, Charles Rigault de Genouilly had replaced Chasseloup-Laubat as naval minister. The finalized design used the same hull as the basic Bourayne design, but with some alterations to the upper works and the arrangement of the armament.

All ten vessels were initially classified as first-class avisos, but were later re-rated as third-class cruisers.

=== Characteristics ===
The first eight ships were 62.28 m (204 ft 4 in) long at the waterline and 65 m (213 ft 3 in) long overall, with a beam of 10.42 m (34 ft 2 in). They had an average draft of 4.33 m (14 ft 2 in) that was at most 4.915 m (16 ft 1.5 in) at the stern, and they displaced 1,296.2 t (1,275.7 long tons; 1,428.8 short tons). The last two ships, Duchaffault and Kerguélen, different slightly in dimensions, being 62.17 m (204 ft 0 in) long at the waterline and 65.16 m (213 ft 9 in). Their beam was identical, but draft decreased slightly to 4.257 m (13 ft 11.6 in) average and 4.8 m (15 ft 9 in) at the stern. Their displacement was slightly lower, at 1,289.3 t (1,268.9 long tons; 1,421.2 short tons). All ten ships had wooden hulls, the first eight completed with straight stems, while the Duchaffault subclass had clipper bows. All ships had a crew of 154 officers and men.

The ships' propulsion system consisted of a single horizontal compound engine that drove a single screw propeller. Steam for the engine was provided by two coal-fired Scotch marine boilers, which were vented through a funnel located amidships. The propulsion system was designed to produce 920 indicated horsepower (690 kW) for a top speed of around 12 knots (22 km/h; 14 mph). In service, these figures varied between 900 to 1,200 ihp (670 to 890 kW) and speeds of 11.3 to 12.8 knots (20.9 to 23.7 km/h; 13.0 to 14.7 mph). On her initial speed trials, Bourayne reached 12.04 knots (22.30 km/h; 13.86 mph) from 960 ihp (720 kW). Coal storage for Bourayne amounted to 186.7 t (183.8 long tons; 205.8 short tons), which allowed the ships to steam for up to 2,950 nautical miles (5,460 km; 3,390 mi) at a cruising speed of 10 knots (19 km/h; 12 mph). Duchaffault could carry up to 223.6 t (220.1 long tons; 246.5 short tons) of coal, which extended her cruising radius considerably to 3,700 nmi (6,900 km; 4,300 mi). Each vessel was fitted with a three-masted barque rig to supplement the steam engine on long voyages abroad.

Duchaffault; note the forward gun mounted on the raised forecastle and the clipper bow

The planned armament for the first eight Bourayne class was to have been a single 194 mm (7.6 in) gun and two 164 mm (6.5 in) guns, but during construction several changes were made, including a reduction of the 164 mm weapons to 140 mm (5.5 in) guns but the addition of third gun of that caliber (Vaudreuil instead received a 138 mm (5.4 in) gun). Segond instead had 121 mm (4.8 in) guns fitted instead of the 140 mm weapons. The 194 mm gun was immediately found to be too heavy for the ships, and so while the first ships were still in the midst of their sea trials, it was replaced across all members of the class with a single 164 mm gun, with the exception of Vaudreuil, which retained her 194 mm gun until 1874. In all of the first eight ships, the main gun was placed on a rotating mount with an iron gun shield forward of the foremast. Several of the ships carried a single 84 mm (3.3 in) bronze mountain gun.

The latter pair of ships underwent similar evolutions for their armament during construction. Initially planned to carry two 194 mm guns in individual barbette mounts and a pair of 164 mm guns, one of the 194 mm pieces was ordered removed in 1869, and then in 1871, the other was replaced with a 164 mm gun while the original 164 mm guns were to be replaced with five 138 mm guns, two per broadside and one at the stern. By the time the two ships were completed in 1874, the armament had been standardized on six 138 mm M1870 guns, four of which were in rotating, shielded mounts on the broadside and the remaining pair in pivot mounts, one on the forecastle and the other on the poop deck. Both ships also carried the 84 mm mountain gun.

=== Modifications ===
The first eight ships' armament was revised several times. By 1871, the 138 mm gun was removed, leaving the 164 mm gun and the three 140 mm weapons. Between 1873 and 1877, all eight of the vessels' armament was standardized on the 164 mm gun in the forward position and five 138 mm M1870 guns. Vaudreuil received a single 100 mm (3.9 in) gun in 1875, and Ducouëdic received a pair of 37 mm (1.5 in) Hotchkiss revolver cannon in 1878. The ships lost their 164 mm gun in favor of a sixth 138 mm weapon during refits that occurred between 1880 and 1888, and most of the cruisers had been fitted with between two and eight of the 37 mm Hotchkiss revolvers. Many of the vessels carried a 65 mm (2.6 in) field gun for use by landing parties beginning in 1884.

The Duchaffault subclass underwent fewer alterations to their guns after entering service. In 1878, Kerguélen had two of the 37 mm Hotchkiss revolver cannon installed, and Duchaffault received five of the weapons in 1884. The latter vessel had a sixth Hotchkiss revolver added in 1889, by which time she had also taken on a 65 mm landing gun. During a refit in 1883, Kerguélen had her forecastle lengthened by 2.5 m (8 ft 2 in).

== Ships ==
Hugon in 1885 en route to French Indochina

Construction data
Name	Laid down	Launched	Completed	Shipyard
Bourayne	19 November 1867	29 May 1869	July 1870	Ernest Goüin et Cie., Nantes
Segond	19 November 1867	24 April 1869	Early 1870	Ernest Goüin et Cie., Nantes
Dayot	19 November 1867	15 April 1869	April 1870	Ernest Goüin et Cie., Nantes
Ducouëdic	28 April 1867	30 March 1869	4 September 1870	Arsenal de Brest, Brest
Kersaint	24 January 1868	7 September 1869	17 August 1870	Arsenal de Lorient, Lorient
Vaudreuil	24 January 1868	26 August 1870	1 March 1871	Arsenal de Lorient, Lorient
Hugon	10 November 1867	6 August 1782	1 April 1873	Arsenal de Brest, Brest
Beautemps-Beaupré	19 November 1867	4 July 1872	18 November 1874	Arsenal de Brest, Brest
Duchaffault	17 August 1868	17 October 1872	10 September 1874	Arsenal de Cherbourg, Cherbourg
Kerguélen	17 August 1868	19 September 1872	1 November 1874	Arsenal de Cherbourg, Cherbourg

== Service history ==
Bourayne driving a junk ashore

=== 1870s ===
Several of the ships were completed in time to serve during the Franco-Prussian War of 1870–1871. Bourayne was sent into the Baltic Sea as part of the French fleet, but she did not see action. Segond, which had been sent to Southeast Asia, operated briefly as a commerce raider, capturing a pair of German vessels before the war ended. Dayot similarly raided German commerce, but in European waters; she captured four prizes during her short raiding career, though one was deemed to have been an illegal capture. Ducouëdic did not see wartime service, but she was activated briefly to transport prisoners from the Paris Commune shortly after the war.

Bourayne was deployed to Southeast Asia in the early 1870s, and while there, she engaged in several actions with local pirates in 1872. Vaudreuil was sent to the Pacific Ocean from 1871 to 1874. Dayot also embarked on a cruise across the Pacific from 1874 to 1877, during which her crew assisted with archaeological excavations in Peru, and came to the aid of a stranded British merchant ship. Ducouëdic patrolled the Indian Ocean and along the east coast of Africa from 1871 to 1874. Kersaint was employed as a fishery protection ship in the Atlantic in 1871, and then patrolled the north and central Atlantic from 1872 to 1875. Duchaffault began a deployment to Southeast Asia in late 1874, which lasted until 1878.

Bourayne made another voyage to the Cochinchina station in 1877–1879. Ducouëdic joined her there in 1878, remaining in the area until 1881. From 1877 to 1879, Segond was sent for a tour of the Pacific. Hugon and Beautemps-Beaupré made their first major overseas voyages from 1877 to 1880, also to China and the Pacific. Both vessels were involved in the suppression of the 1878 Kanak revolt against French colonial rule. On the way home in 1879, Hugon stopped in Chile to protect French interests during the War of the Pacific. Dayot returned to the Pacific in 1879, joining Hugon as part of France's response to the conflict in South America. The following year, she assisted in the suppression of a rebellion against colonial rule in French Polynesia.

=== 1880s ===
Dayot in Algiers in the 1880s

In the early 1880s, several members of the class were sent to Southeast Asia as France's campaign to gain control of Indochina accelerated. These included Kersaint, which was initially sent to Shanghai, China, and so missed several major engagements during the Tonkin campaign in 1883. After the conflict in Tonkin spiraled into the Sino-French War of 1884–1885, Duchaffault was transferred from New Caledonia to join the war against China. She and Kersaint were assigned to the blockade of Formosa, but the French lacked sufficient cruisers to effectively blockade the island. Duchaffault was assigned to the fleet that attacked the Pescadores in the closing days of the war. During the fighting, she bombarded Chinese fortifications and supporting the French soldiers who landed on the islands. Kerguélen arrived late in the campaign, and briefly served with the blockade force. Hugon was sent in early 1885 to reinforce the French squadron, but arrived too late to see any fighting.

Simultaneously, the French also waged the First Madagascar expedition from 1883 to 1885; Vaudreuil and Beautemps-Beaupré were part of the initial expeditionary force sent to conquer the island. The French bombarded the city of Tamatave and then landed men from their ships to garrison it after Merina government forces abandoned it. The fighting continued sporadically around the island for the next two years, but neither side made significant progress. In 1884, Vaudreuil returned home, while Beautemps-Beaupré took part in blockade operations. Vaudreuil arrived back off Madagascar in 1885, when she assisted in coordinating the peace treaty that ended the fighting in December 1885.

Kersaint was struck from the naval register in December 1884, the first member of the class to leave service. A typhoon drove Dayot ashore at Tamatave, Madagascar, on 22 February 1888, destroying the ship. She was the only member of the class to be lost. Ducouëdic was struck from the naval register in January 1889 and converted into a storage hulk from 1889. Bourayne and Vaudreuil were stuck in June that year and also hulked.

=== 1890s ===
Beautemps-Beaupré, date unknown, likely in Algiers

In 1890, Kerguélen was involved in the First Franco-Dahomean War in western Africa, where she helped to blockade the Dahomean coast. Hugon was sent to the Indian Ocean station in 1890, and she remained in the region through 1894. Following the defeat of Béhanzin, the king of Dahomey, in the Second Franco-Dahomean War of 1894, Segond carried Béhanzin and a small entourage into exile in Dakar in French Senegal.

By the mid-1890s, the surviving members of the class began to be withdrawn from active service. Segond was struck in 1894, used as a training ship from then until 1896, when she was broken up. Kerguélen was also removed from the naval register in 1894 and used in a variety of secondary roles over the following years. Hugon was struck in 1895 and sold at Lorient the following year. Beautemps-Beaupré was taken out of service in 1896 and used as a coal hulk in Corsica until 1909, when she was sold. Duchaffault met a similar end, being reduced to a coal storage hulk in Bizerte in 1897 and being sold for scrap there in 1907. Kerguélen was eventually sold at Lorient in 1913. Vaudreuil was eventually broken up in 1917. Ducouëdic was eventually sold for scrap in 1920. Bourayne followed her to the breakers' yard in 1929.
