= Sané-class cruiser =

- Sané in port, date unknown

Class overview
- Builders: Toulon arsenal; Rochefort Arsenal
- Preceded by: Infernet class
- Succeeded by: Bourayne class
- Built: 1866–1875
- In service: 1872–1899
- Completed: 3
- Scrapped: 3

General characteristics
- Type: Unprotected cruiser
- Displacement: 1,943 t (1,912 long tons; 2,142 short tons)
- Length: 81.51 m (267 ft 5 in) loa
- Beam: 11.01 m (36 ft 1 in)
- Draft: 5.52 m (18 ft 1 in) (max)
- Installed power: 4 × fire-tube boilers; 1,800–2,000 ihp (1,300–1,500 kW)
- Propulsion: 1 × compound engine; 1 × screw propeller
- Sail plan: Barque rig
- Speed: 15 knots (28 km/h; 17 mph)
- Range: 6,140 nmi (11,370 km; 7,070 mi) at 10 knots (19 km/h; 12 mph)
- Complement: 206
- Armament: Sané: 6 × 138.6 mm (5.46 in) guns; Seignelay and Fabert: 8 × 138.6 mm guns

The Sané class of unprotected cruisers comprised three ships—Sané, Seignelay, and Fabert—that were built for the French Navy in the late 1860s and early 1870s. The ships were modeled on the fast commerce raiders used by the Confederate Navy during the American Civil War. The designers initially planned to equip the ships with three large 194 mm (7.6 in) guns, but these weapons proved to be far too heavy. After a series of changes, the armament was set at six 138.6 mm (5.46 in) guns for Sané; the other two ships received eight of the guns.

== Design ==
Having seen the effectiveness of fast, commerce-raiding cruisers operated by the Confederate Navy during the American Civil War in the early 1860s, the French admirals Richild Givel and Philippe Victor Touchard argued that the French Navy ought to build similar vessels. On 19 October 1864, the French naval minister, Prosper de Chasseloup-Laubat, issued a request for design proposals to the Toulon and Brest Arsenals for a new ship similar to the vessels then in use by the Confederates, most notably CSS Alabama. Armament was to consist of four to six large-caliber guns, and top speed was set at 14 knots (26 km/h; 16 mph); the ship must have sufficient coal storage to steam at that pace for seven days, along with a sailing rig to supplement the steam engine. The competition, which continued through several revisions in 1865 and 1866 before finally being approved on 10 January 1867, resulted in two designs: the Infernet class and the Sané class. The design for the latter was prepared by the naval engineer Louis Dutard, and it was formally approved on 30 July 1866.

The armament of both classes was subject to repeated revisions while they were being designed and then during construction. Initially, all of the ships were to carry a main battery of six 164.7 mm (6.48 in) guns in a combination of pivot mounts fore and aft and on the broadside. But on 30 April 1867, Chasseloup-Laubat's successor, Charles Rigault de Genouilly, mandated the armament be changed to just three 194 mm (7.6 in) guns, all on the centerline. Infernet, the first ship to be completed, entered service with these guns, which proved to be far too heavy. Since the three Sané-class cruisers were still under construction, their armament was revised to a single 164.7 mm (6.48 in) gun and six 138.6 mm (5.46 in) guns on 15 February 1871. Louis Pierre Alexis Pothuau, who had since become the naval minister, ordered yet another change already on 17 April 1871, restored the original three-gun arrangement, but now reduced to all 164.7 mm guns. Sané was completed with these guns, but during her initial testing, it was found that the center gun had very restricted arcs of fire.

=== Characteristics ===
The Sané-class ships were 79.84 m (261 ft 11 in) long at the waterline and 81.51 m (267 ft 5 in) long overall, with a beam of 11.01 m (36 ft 1 in). They had an average draft of 4.84 m (15 ft 11 in) that was at most 5.52 m (18 ft 1 in) at the stern, and they displaced 1,943 t (1,912 long tons; 2,142 short tons). Their hulls were of wooden construction, with straight stems and raked sterns. They had a short forecastle deck, and their superstructure consisted of a small bridge placed amidships. The ships had a crew of 203–206 officers and enlisted sailors.

The ships' propulsion system consisted of a single horizontal compound engine that drove a single screw propeller. Steam for the engine was provided by four coal-burning fire-tube boilers aboard Sané and Fabert, while Seignelay received six fire-tube boilers. The ships' boilers were vented through a funnel located amidships, just aft of the bridge. The propulsion system was designed to produce 1,800–2,000 indicated horsepower (1,300–1,500 kW) for a top speed of around 15 knots (28 km/h; 17 mph). Seignelay was recorded as reaching 14.47 knots (26.80 km/h; 16.65 mph) on her initial trials. The ships carried 336 t (331 long tons; 370 short tons) of coal, which allowed them to steam for 6,140 nautical miles (11,370 km; 7,070 mi) at a more economical speed of 10 knots (19 km/h; 12 mph). The Sané-class cruisers were fitted with a three-masted barque rig to supplement the steam engines.

Sané was completed with three 164.7 mm M1864 guns, each of which was mounted on a rotating platform and fitted with a gun shield. After trials made it apparent that this armament was unsatisfactory, the naval minister Charles de Dompierre d'Hornoy ordered the center and aft gun replaced with six 138.6 mm (5.46 in) M1870 guns of 21.3-calibers length on 16 June 1873. This work was deferred for nearly a year, and in June 1874, the armament was revised slightly by removing one of the 138.6 mm guns. Before work began, however, the Toulon arsenal recommended a uniform battery of six 138.6 mm guns, two on the existing bow and stern platforms and the remainder placed amidships on the broadside, which d'Hornoy approved on 28 July. This became the ship's definitive armament, which she carried for the remainder of her career.

The lessons learned through the experience of Sané and Infernet were applied to Seignelay and Fabert while they were still under construction, so they were completed with a standardized battery of 138.6 mm guns, though they differed from Sané by the addition of two more of the weapons. These were also placed on the broadside. Each ship also received 86.5 mm (3.41 in) bronze cannon for use aboard the ships' boats; Seignelay received three of these guns while Fabert had two.

=== Modifications ===
In the 1880s, each of the ships underwent major refits that included the installation of a secondary battery of light weapons for defense against torpedo boats. Sané's refit took place in 1885, and she received eight 37 mm (1.5 in) guns, along with new boilers. Her broadside 138.6 mm guns were also moved to sponsons to improve their firing arcs. Seignelay was refitted in 1886, also being reboilered, and eight 37 mm guns were added, two of which were single-barrel weapons and the remainder Hotchkiss revolver cannon. Fabert had new boilers installed in 1885. Five years later, she had her broadside guns moved to sponsons, and she received six 37 mm guns and a single 65 mm (2.6 in) gun. In 1893, Fabert's bridge was replaced with a new structure, and another set of boilers was installed between 1893 and 1894.

== Ships ==
Construction data
Name	Laid down	Launched	Completed	Shipyard
Sané	13 September 1866	9 April 1870	2 April 1872	Toulon arsenal
Seignelay	12 September 1866	5 February 1874	February 1875	Toulon arsenal
Fabert	1 March 1868	1 August 1874	December 1875	Rochefort Arsenal

== Service history ==
Seignelay in Toulon

=== Sané ===
After entering service in late 1872, Sané was initially assigned to the Escadre d'évolution (Training Squadron), where she acted as an aviso for the unit's capital ships. After a brief period with the unit, she was placed in reserve in May 1873 for modifications that were completed by early 1875. At that time, she was reactivated for a cruise to the Antilles.

Sané was struck from the naval register on 13 December 1892, used as a storage hulk from then until 1899 at the Rochefort Arsenal, and then moved to Brest. She remained in use as a hulk there until 1909, when she received equipment to calibrate torpedoes, a role she filled until 1913, when she was placed for sale.

=== Seignelay ===
Seignelay caught fire while still under construction in June 1874, but she was completed by October that year to begin sea trials. She was similarly decommissioned for modifications in 1875 before being deployed to the Pacific Ocean to patrol France's colonial interests in the region in December 1875.

On 26 April 1891, Seignelay ran aground off Jaffa in the Ottoman Empire; she was refloated on 1 May and then towed to Toulon. She saw no further active service, and was struck from the register on 16 May 1892. The ship was sold in August 1892.

=== Fabert ===
Fabert remained out of service for the first two years of her career, being commissioned only in October 1877 for a deployment to the Indian Ocean station.

The ship was struck from the naval register on 25 November 1899 and thereafter used as a training ship for naval cadets based at Marseille. The naval school there closed in 1903, and Fabert was accordingly sold to ship breakers in August 1903.
