= Liuqiang =

Regional form of Chinese opera

Liuqiang (柳腔)
- Etymology: From liuqiang (溜腔, "escaping tune")
- Origin: Mid-Qing dynasty (18th century); Western Jimo
- Major region: Qingdao and parts of eastern Shandong
- Typical instruments: sihu; erhu; zhonghu; pipa; yueqin; sanxian; yangqin; sheng; suona; dizi; bangu; gong; bo; tanggu
- Topolect: Qingdao dialect (specifically, Jimo dialect)
- Tune system: Bangzi

Liuqiang (Chinese: 柳腔; pinyin: Liǔqiāng) is a regional form of Chinese opera from Jimo District, Qingdao in eastern Shandong province. It arose in the mid-Qing dynasty from benzhougu (本肘鼓), a quyi created by beggars. Liuqiang was included in the national intangible cultural heritage list in 2008.

Liuqiang is centered in Qingdao, Pingdu, Laiyang, Laixi, Haiyang, and Jiaozhou City. It is closely related to maoqiang, a regional form also derived from benzhougu and popular further west. Many older artists could perform both.

== History ==
Liuqiang originated in the western part of Jimo during the mid-Qing Dynasty. In 1748, floods and pest outbreaks made people's lives miserable, and many fled to other areas begging while singing about their experiences using tunes from their hometowns. Their performing style was given the name of zhouguzi (肘鼓子, "elbow drum", or 周姑子) or benzhougu. When this style arrived in Jimo, it integrated with local folk music and yangge dance and gradually evolved into an early form of liuqiang. Places where it was particularly well-received included Liujiazhuang (劉家莊, in today's Duanbolan), Lügezhuang (呂戈莊, in today's Yifengdian), Nuocheng (挪城, in today's Lancun Subdistrict), and Fengxiangzhuang (豐享莊, in Yifengdian). In the beginning, the only instruments were gong and hand drums, but enthusiasts later used the sihu to accompany the singing. As the singing and accompaniment did not always match, higher and higher went their pitches, which gave rise to the name liuqiang (Chinese: 溜腔; pinyin: liūqiāng; lit. 'escaping tune', later the better-sounding 柳腔, "willowy tune").

Early liuqiang performances were held during festivals and slack farming seasons, with three or five performers and little regard of costumes, role types, face painting, and music. Sometimes, an actor needed to play several roles in one play. In the ensuing decades, performances became more complicated and professional. Around 1900, five professional troupes were established in Liujiazhuang, Qiji (七級, in Yifengdian), Yifeng (移風, also in Yifengdian), and Nanquan (南泉, in Lancun) which performed not just locally, but also in more urban places like Pingdu, Ye County (now Laizhou), and Laiyang. After the 1911 Revolution, performers like Jiang Wenxing (江文興), Jiang Wenlong (江文龍), Dong Qiansan (董乾三), Fan Youshan (范友山), Lan Dexian (蘭德先), Liu Zuolian (劉作廉), and Yang Lida (楊立達) went to Qingdao and performed in theaters in Dongzhen (東鎮, in today's Shibei District), Shinan, Sifang, and Cangkou. Many of them traveled regularly between rural and urban areas.

After the Second Sino-Japanese War broke out in 1937, Japanese invaders forbade rural performances. Liu Zuolian and others returned to Qingdao where they expanded their troupes and established a base for regular performances. During this period, liuqiang actors often performed together with actors of Hebei bangzi, Ping opera, maoqiang and Peking opera on the same stage, sometimes in the same play. In the process, liuqiang was able to absorb many elements from other Chinese operas.

In 1950, the Venus Liuqiang Opera Troupe (金星柳腔劇團) was established in Qingdao. It was renamed the Qingdao Liuqiang Opera Troupe in 1959 and went to Beijing to perform traditional repertoire to national leaders. During the Cultural Revolution professional troupes were disbanded and performances banned until 1976. In 1976, Qingdao's Cultural Affairs Bureau had former professional actors mentor a young generation of actors for two years, and only after that did performances resume. In January 1989, Jimo Liuqiang Opera Troupe again performed in Beijing.

== Famous artists ==
Song Xunguang (宋询光, 1916–1975) was the leader of the Qingdao Liuqiang Opera Troupe. He was born in Jimo and started his stage career when he was 18, specializing in xiaosheng roles. In the early 1940s, Song Xunguang went to Qingdao and performed maoqiang. In 1949, he joined the Qingdao Maoqiang Opera Troupe and was later transferred to the Venus Liuqiang Opera Troupe before being appointed the head of the troupe. During the Cultural Revolution, he was tortured and sent back to his hometown. In October 1975, the Cultural Affairs Bureau read out the decision to vindicate him in front of his death bed. He died the next day at the age of 58.

Zhang Xiyun (张喜云, 1931–1982), born Jiang Yunhua (姜云华), was from Jiao County (today's Jiaozhou City). When she was eight years old, she learned maoqiang from her aunt. After the 1949 Chinese Communist Revolution, Zhang Xiyun joined what later became the Qingdao Liuqiang Opera Troupe. Zhang Xiyun mainly impersonated men in xiaosheng roles, although she also acted in qingyi roles. Her sister Zhang Xiuyu (张秀云, 1928–1995) played dan roles.
