= Zhang Gaoyuan =

Baturu Zhang Gaoyuan 章高元
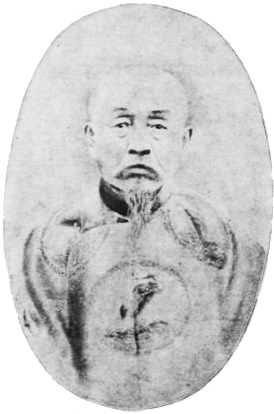
- A Photograph of Zhang Gaoyuan in the 1912 lithograph "Mr. Zhang Dingchen's Xingshu"
- Born: 1843; Hefei, Anhui, China
- Died: 1912 (Aged 69); Shanghai, China
- Military career
- Allegiance: Qing dynasty
- Branch: Imperial Chinese Army
- Service years: 1860's — 1898
- Nickname: Dingchen
- Commands: Huai Army
- Conflicts: Taiping Rebellion: Battle of Anqing; Sino-French War: Battle of Tamsui; First Sino-Japanese War

Zhang Gaoyuan (Chinese: 章高元; 1843–1912) was a general of the Huai Army during the late Qing dynasty.

== Biography ==
Zhang Gaoyuan joined the Huai Army in his early years and was Liu Mingchuan's subordinate. He had participated in the suppression of the Taiping Army and the Nian Army, and was promoted to the rank of lieutenant. Later, he was appointed by Liu Mingchuan as the pioneer of the cavalry brigade and moved to Shandong and Anhui. In the Battle of Anqing, he was promoted to the general of the army for his merits and rewarded the "Singular Brave Baturu".

In 1874, the Japanese invaded Taiwan and landed from Langqiao (now Hengchun). Zhang Gaoyuan was ordered to enter Taiwan with the army, then withdrew to the mainland and stationed in Jiangyin. In 1884, the French army invaded Taiwan, and Zhang Gaoyuan followed Liu Ming to cross the sea to defend Taiwan. At that time, the French army had already occupied Keelung . He vowed to fight to the death, and led his troops to "Ride into the French fortress by night, and fight hand-to-hand with short-handedness. They are too sharp and deadly." In the battle against Tamsui in Keelung, Zhang Gaoyuan led his troops to achieve great success. After the war, he was promoted to the Penghu Town General Soldier and was rewarded and replaced with the "Nianchang Abatulu". In 1885, Zhang Gaoyuan went to thank the Tamsui temple gods blessing, and presented the Tamsui Su House Ye Temple with the "Wheeling Hezhuo" plaque to thank the gods bless. He also donated to build four (13 meters) square atrium stones at the Longshan Temple in Tamsui. Later, he was ordered to replace Zhang Jiabin as the general soldier of Penghu Town. He was then ordered by his superiors to open up the mountainous areas of Taiwan. In 1888, within the name of the General Soldier of Taiwan Town, the deputy general Wan Guoben participated in the crusade against the Manabang Society of the Atayal Manabang Mountain in Miaoli.

In 1887, he was transferred to the general army of Dengzhou, Shandong . In the autumn of 1892, he led the two battalions of the Songwu Army and the two battalions of the Guangwu Army with a total of four battalions of about 2,000 troops stationed in Jiao'ao . During the rubber O garrison, he presided over the construction of the rubber O guarding government offices, barracks, arsenals, forts, before the sea, Jetty, Cable and Wireless, a leading construction of Jiaozhou road, and on the Qingdao infrastructure build at the beginning made a certain contribution.

After the outbreak of the First Sino-Japanese War, he granted eight battalions of troops to reinforce the Liaodong Peninsula, in the cover flat in Gaizhou River engaged the invading Japanese army from the south coast and while they suffered major losses, the Chinese lost Gaizhou. After the First Sino-Japanese War, he led his army back to Jiao'ao. On November 14, 1897, Germany used the Juye Religious Case as an excuse to send its Far East Fleet to invade Jiaozhou Bay. Zhang Gaoyuan was forced by the imperial court's order to ban war, and the force under his jurisdiction was insufficient, so he led his troops to the nearby Housifang Village, and later to Cangkou. On November 19, Zhang Gaoyuan was threatened by the Imperial German Army to go to the German barracks for negotiations, and was detained by the German army. On December 3, he was released. On December 17, he was ordered to lead all his troops to evacuate Jiao'ao and retreat to Yantai . In February 1898, he was removed from office.

In 1900, he served as the General Soldier of Tianjin, and soon he was transferred to General Soldier of Chongqing. Later, he was exempted from illness and lived in Nanjing.

In 1912, he died of illness in Shanghai.
