= Liu Qiang =

Liu Qiang may refer to:

- Liu Qiang (born 1961), vice mayor of Chongqing
- Liu Qiang (politician, born 1964), vice governor of Liaoning
- Liu Qiang (politician, born 1971), former vice governor of Shandong, the current party secretary of Jinan.
- Liu Qiang (boxer), born 1982
- Liuqiang, a form of Chinese opera from Qingdao

== See also ==
- Liu Qiong, actor
