= Battle of Tamsui =

Battle of the Sino-French War on Taiwan

Coordinates: 25.19°N 121.41°E

- Part of Sino-French War
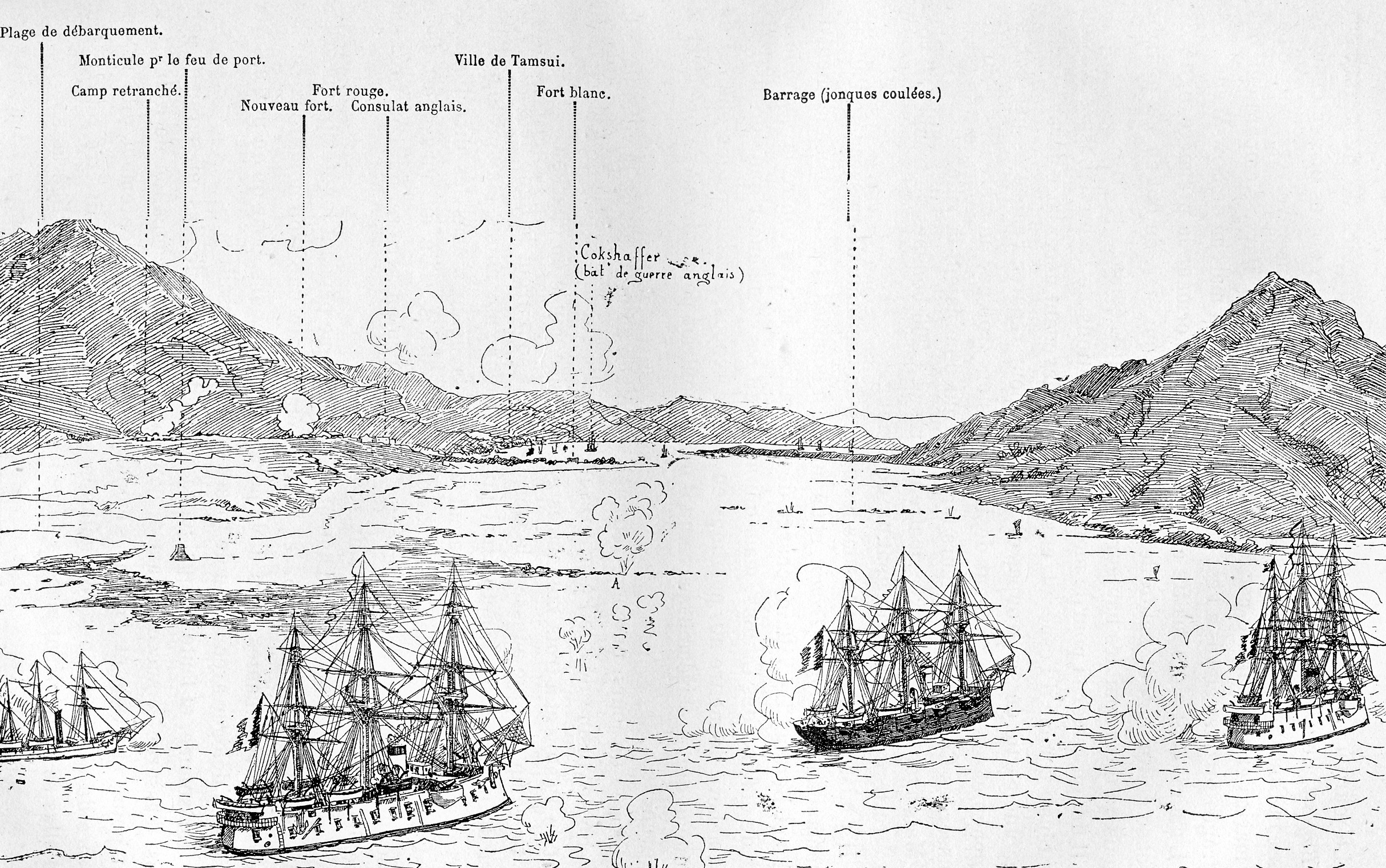
- French warships bombard Tamsui, 2 October 1884
Date	2–8 October 1884
Location	Northern coast of Taiwan
Result	Chinese victory

Belligerents
France	(Qing dynasty) China

Commanders and leaders
(French Third Republic) Sébastien Lespès	(Qing dynasty) Sun Kaihua (Qing dynasty) Zhang Gaoyuan (Qing dynasty) Liu Chaoyou (Qing dynasty) Tio Li-xieng

Units involved
Far East Squadron	Unknown

Strength
6 ships 600 marines	2,000–4,000 (with artillery batteries)

Casualties and losses
17 killed 49 wounded	80 killed 200 wounded

The Battle of Tamsui, Danshui, or Hobe (2–8 October 1884) was a significant battle where French military forces were defeated by Qing forces at Tamsui on Taiwan during the Keelung Campaign of the Sino-French War.

== Background ==
The battle of Tamsui was part of the Keelung Campaign (August 1884–April 1885). Following the outbreak of the Sino-French War on 23 August 1884, the French decided to put pressure on China by landing an expeditionary corps in northern Formosa to seize Keelung and Tamsui. On 1 October Lieutenant-Colonel Bertaux-Levillain landed at Keelung with a force of 1,800 marine infantry, forcing the Chinese to withdraw to strong defensive positions which had been prepared in the surrounding hills. Meanwhile, a second French force under the command of Rear Admiral Sébastien Lespès prepared to attack Tamsui.

Liu Mingchuan took measures to reinforce Tamsui, in the river nine torpedo mines were planted and the entrance was blocked with ballast boats filled with stone which were sunk on September 3, matchlock armed "Hakka hill people" were used to reinforce the mainland Chinese battalion, and around the British Consulate and Customs House at the Red Fort hilltop, Shanghai Arsenal manufactured Krupp guns were used to form an additional battery.

== Bombardment on 2 October ==
On 1 October 1884, while the Formosa expeditionary corps went ashore at Keelung, Lespès lay off Tamsui with the ironclads La Galissonnière and Triomphante, the cruiser D'Estaing and the gunboat Vipère. His orders from Courbet were to bombard the Chinese forts at Tamsui, destroy the barrage across the Tamsui River and seize Tamsui itself.

The town of Tamsui or Hobe had a population of around 6,000 at this period, including a small European colony. Tamsui was defended by two major forts, both to the west of the town. The 'White Fort', (Note: Chinese: t 白砲臺, s 白炮台, p Bái Pàotái, w Pai P‘ao-t‘ai; French: Fort Blanc. The fort was also known in Chinese as Fort Zhonglun. (Note: Chinese: t 中崙砲台, s 中仑炮台, p Zhōnglún Pàotái, w Chung-lun P‘ao-t‘ai.)) so called by the French to distinguish it from Fort Santo Domingo, the seventeenth-century Spanish 'Red Fort' (Note: French: Fort Rouge, but known in Chinese as the "Redheads' Fort". (Note: Chinese: t 紅毛城, s 红毛城, p Hóngmáo Chéng, w Hung-mao Ch‘êng.)) that had become the premises of the British consulate in Tamsui, was a shore battery that commanded the entrance to the Tamsui River. To the northeast, defending the town against a landing, was a fort still under construction, the 'New Fort' (Fort Neuf). Although the New Fort was only partly armed, it had an excellent all-round field of fire. Other important fortification works had been built on all the neighbouring ridges.

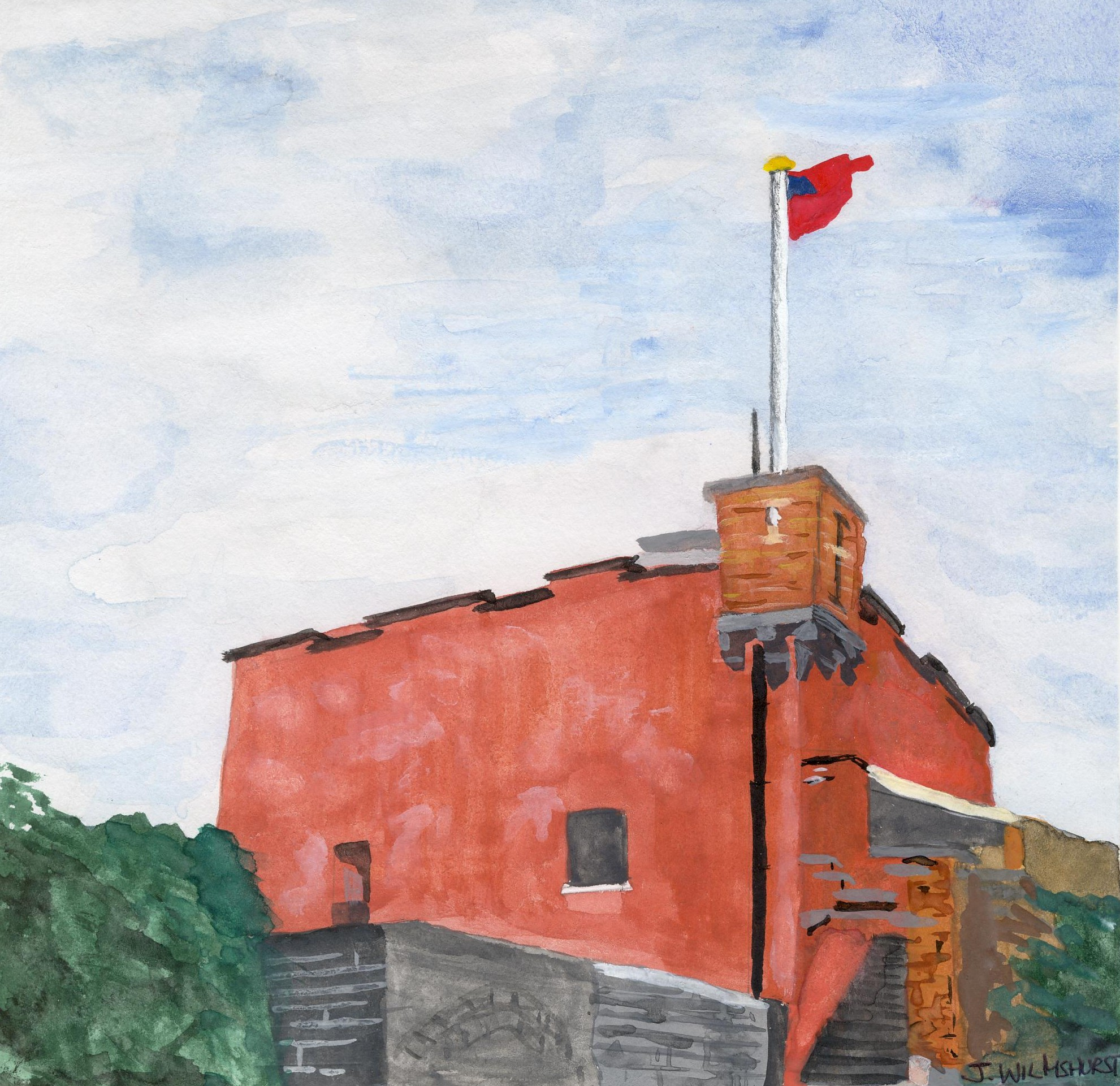
Fort Santo Domingo, the premises of the British consulate in 1884

The arrival of the French flotilla was the signal for feverish activity ashore, as the Chinese worked throughout the afternoon and evening to arm the New Fort and deployed their troops to repel any attempt to land by the French. The European residents of Tamsui, many of whom were British, hastily hung out Union Jacks from their houses to signal their neutrality to the French ships.

As the French warships were unable to enter the Tamsui River, Lespès decided to bombard the White Fort and the New Fort on the morning of 2 October. In fact hostilities were begun by the Chinese, who began firing at sunrise on 2 October with three cannon which they had placed in the barbette of the New Fort the previous evening. The French flotilla immediately replied, delivering a heavy bombardment which lasted for several hours, eventually destroying the three Chinese guns and putting both the New Fort and the White Fort out of action.

More than 2,000 shells were fired against the two forts. Many failed to explode on impact, and remained dangerous for days afterwards. Others missed their targets, because the bombardment was delivered from long range, and damaged many buildings in Tamsui itself, including all the European residences. The Canadian Presbyterian missionary George Mackay remained in his house in Tamsui during the French bombardment, refusing to take shelter aboard the British gunboat HMS Cockchafer anchored off Tamsui, because he could not take his Formosan converts with him. He left a vivid description of the attack:

When the bombarding began we put our little children under the floor of the house, that they might not be alarmed. My wife went out and in during these trying hours. I paced the front of the house with A Hoa, while shot and shell whizzed and burst all around us. One shell struck a part of Oxford College, another a corner of the Girls’ School, and still another a stone in front of us, and sent it into mid-air in a thousand atoms. A little to the west of us another went into the ground, gouging a great hole and sending up a cloud of dust and stones. The suction of one, as it passed, was like a sudden gust of wind. Amid the smoke from forts and ships, and the roar and thunder of shot and shell, we walked to and fro, feeling that our God was round about us.

— George Mackay, From Far Formosa

Mackay said later, in a conversation recorded by the Anglican missionary William Campbell, that the French marksmanship had been very inaccurate and had recklessly endangered the lives of innocent civilians.

== French preparations on 2–7 October ==
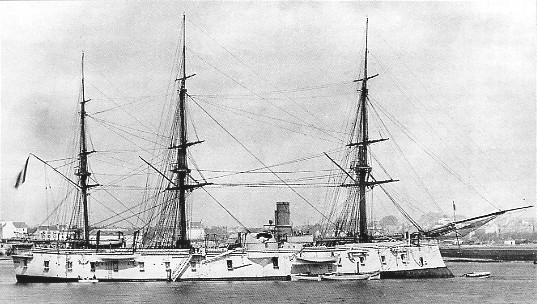
The French flagship, La Galissonnière

Realising that his naval bombardment had failed to achieve its objective and as he had only a small landing force at his disposal, Admiral Lespès sent D'Estaing back to Keelung on the evening of 2 October to request reinforcements of a battalion of marine infantry to enable him to make a landing to the north of the river, seize the forts, then destroy the command post from which the mines could be detonated. The French could then clear the pass by exploding a large powder charge, and the ships could enter the river. Meanwhile, he attempted to neutralise the mines himself. On the evening of 2 October the gunboat Vipère scouted the pass and located the buoys of the mines. On the following night the launches tried to drag the electric wires. They failed, and one of them was almost destroyed when the Chinese exploded one of the mines at a distance.

D'Estaing reached Keelung on the afternoon of 3 October. By then the French had already secured the hills to the west of the town and the Chinese had retreated, but Courbet was reluctant to release one of his three battalions of marine infantry. It was probably the correct decision, though it would later be criticised. Although the Chinese had momentarily fallen back, they might launch a counterattack at any moment and, if they did, the French would need every man to hold the extensive defence perimeter they had just established at Keelung.

Courbet nevertheless did what he could to give Lespès a respectable landing force. He sent him three more ships (Tarn, Châteaurenault and Duguay-Trouin), which arrived off Tamsui on the evening of 5 October. They carried their own landing companies and also the landing company from Bayard, giving Lespès a total of 600 men available for shore operations. Lespès thereupon began making preparations for a landing to assault the defences of Tamsui and clear the mines from the mouth of the Tamsui River.

He organised the 600 sailors available for a landing into a battalion of five companies under the command of capitaine de frégate Martin of La Galissonnière, who had commanded the landing force at Keelung on 5 August with distinction. The ironclads Bayard, La Galissonnière and Triomphante each supplied one company. The cruiser D'Estaing and Châteaurenault provided a fourth company, and Tarn and Duguay-Trouin a fifth.

== Chinese preparations on 2–7 October ==
The Chinese defence was commanded by General Sun Kaihua, who had been responsible for building the New Fort in 1876. He was assisted by General Zhang Gaoyuan (Note: Chinese: 章高元, p Zhāng Gāoyuán, w Chang Kao-yuan.) and Brigadier-General Liu Chaoyou, (Note: Chinese: t 劉朝祐, s 刘朝祐, p Liú Cháoyòu, w Liu Ch‘ao-yu.) Liu Mingchuan's great-nephew. According to Liu Mingchuan's official report of the battle, the Chinese force included the Cho-Sheng Regiment, whose commanders included Gong Zhan'ao (Note: Chinese: t 龔占鼇, s 龚占鳌, p Gōng Zhàn'áo, w Kung Chan-ao.) (right wing), Li Dingming (Note: Chinese: 李定明, p Lǐ Dìngmíng, w Li Ting-ming.) (centre division) and Fan Huiyi (Note: Chinese: 范惠意, p Fàn Huìyì, w Fan Hui-yi.) (rear division). Two other regular battalions from different regiments were also present, under the direct command of Zhang Gaoyuan and Liu Chaoyou. A battalion of Formosan hillmen, recently enrolled by Li Tong'en, (Note: Chinese: 李彤恩, p Lǐ Tóng'ēn, w Li T‘ung-ên.) also fought in a skirmishing role, under the command of Tio Li-xieng. (Note: Chinese: t 張李成, s 张李成, p Zhāng Lǐchéng, w Chang Li-ch‘êng.) The Chinese force seems to have numbered around 1,000 infantry in total.

General Sun deployed the Cho-Sheng Regiment in the front line. He entrenched one line of infantry in front of Fort Santo Domingo facing northwest, the direction from which a French assault was expected, and placed a second line of infantry in wooded terrain on the right flank, almost at a right angle to the main Chinese trenches, where it could enfilade the French advance before it reached the main defences. According to Liu Mingchuan's report, Gong's division was posted at a spot known as 'the false creek' (Chia-chiang), and Li's division lay in ambush at Yu-ch'e-k'ou. Neither locality can now be identified. Sun commanded the regiment's defence in person.

Behind Fort Santo Domingo, General Zhang and Brigadier-General Liu lay in reserve with two battalions of regulars, each from a different regiment, ready to counterattack when the moment was ripe. Tio Li-xieng's hillmen were posted close to the shore in the hills to the north of the main Chinese positions, enabling them to skirmish against the left flank of the advancing French. These were intelligent dispositions, well-chosen to repulse a frontal attack.

== Battle on 8 October ==
Rough seas on 6 October and 7 October prevented a landing, but on 8 October the sea was finally calm enough for a landing to take place, and Admiral Lespès landed his 600 fusiliers-marins opposite the New Fort early in the morning. Captain Martin of La Galissonnière, the officer originally scheduled to command the attack, was ill, and command of the attack was transferred at the last moment to capitaine de frégate Boulineau of Châteaurenault. The squadron was deployed in line ahead off the harbour entrance to support the attack, facing north. The line was headed by Châteaurenault, followed by d'Estaing, Tarn, Triomphante, Duguay-Trouin and La Galissonnière, with Vipère bringing up the rear.

Many of the town's European residents, excited by the prospect of a battle, formed picnic parties and flocked to vantage points on the nearby hills to obtain a good view of events. They were confident that the French would win, and expected Tamsui to be in French hands by nightfall.

Boulineau deployed his five companies into two lines, with a strong guard out to the left where the danger of a flanking attack by the Chinese was strongest. His first line consisted of the landing companies of La Galissonnière and Triomphante, each of 120 men, under the respective command of lieutenants de vaisseau Fontaine and Dehorter. Dehorter's company held the right of the line. The second line, 200 metres (660 ft) behind the first, consisted of the two mixed companies from the smaller ships, each of 130 men. The company from Tarn and Duguay-Trouin, under the command of enseigne de vaisseau Deman, was on the right, behind Dehorter's company. Bayard's landing company, 100 men strong, was posted on the left flank of the main body. The deployment, which was completed by 10:00 am was protected by naval gunfire from the French flotilla, which swept the ground between the beach and the forts.

At 10 am, Boulineau led his small force forward at a smart pace over the sand dunes. Things immediately began to go wrong. The dunes had hidden the ground beyond from the sight of the French squadron. The French had been expecting to find an open terrain of rice paddies and small clumps of trees. Instead, they discovered that the approaches to the forts were thickly wooded. The battlefield was dotted with small cultivated fields surrounded by tall hedges and spiny plants. The ground was also broken by ditches, and covered with tall bushy trees. This broken terrain provided perfect cover for the Chinese, and made control by the French commanders almost impossible.

The companies and sections lost sight of one another as soon as they entered the scrub. They also began to drift off the line of advance prescribed by Admiral Lespès. Boulineau realised that there was nothing he could do to regain control, and decided he would have to rely on the initiative of his company commanders. The New Fort was still visible in the distance, so the four companies of his main body could at least see the direction in which they were supposed to be heading.

Around 11:30 am, the sailors from Triomphante, on the right of the first line, made contact with Sun Kaihua's troops, concealed in the bushes and trenches between the White Fort and the New Fort. A firefight began at this point, which quickly spread along the French front line and drew in the landing company of La Galissonnière. The French front line was now under heavy fire from both the Chinese trenches to its front and from the concealed enemy positions in the woods and hedges on its left. The two reserve companies, which had fallen into disorder while picking their way across the broken ground, came up to the front line shortly afterwards. The landing company from D'Estaing and Châteaurenault entered the line between Fontaine and Dehorter's companies, while Deman's company joined the left of the line.

Meanwhile, the Chinese had begun to put pressure on the French left. Despite the supporting fire provided by the French ships, Zhang Gaoyuan's troops were able to force back the French flankguard from Bayard, pushing it back on the French main body. Bayard's sailors were able to link up with Deman's company, but the French landing force was now deployed in a single line around one and a half kilometres (4,900 ft) long. It no longer had any reserves. The firefight extended along the entire French front.

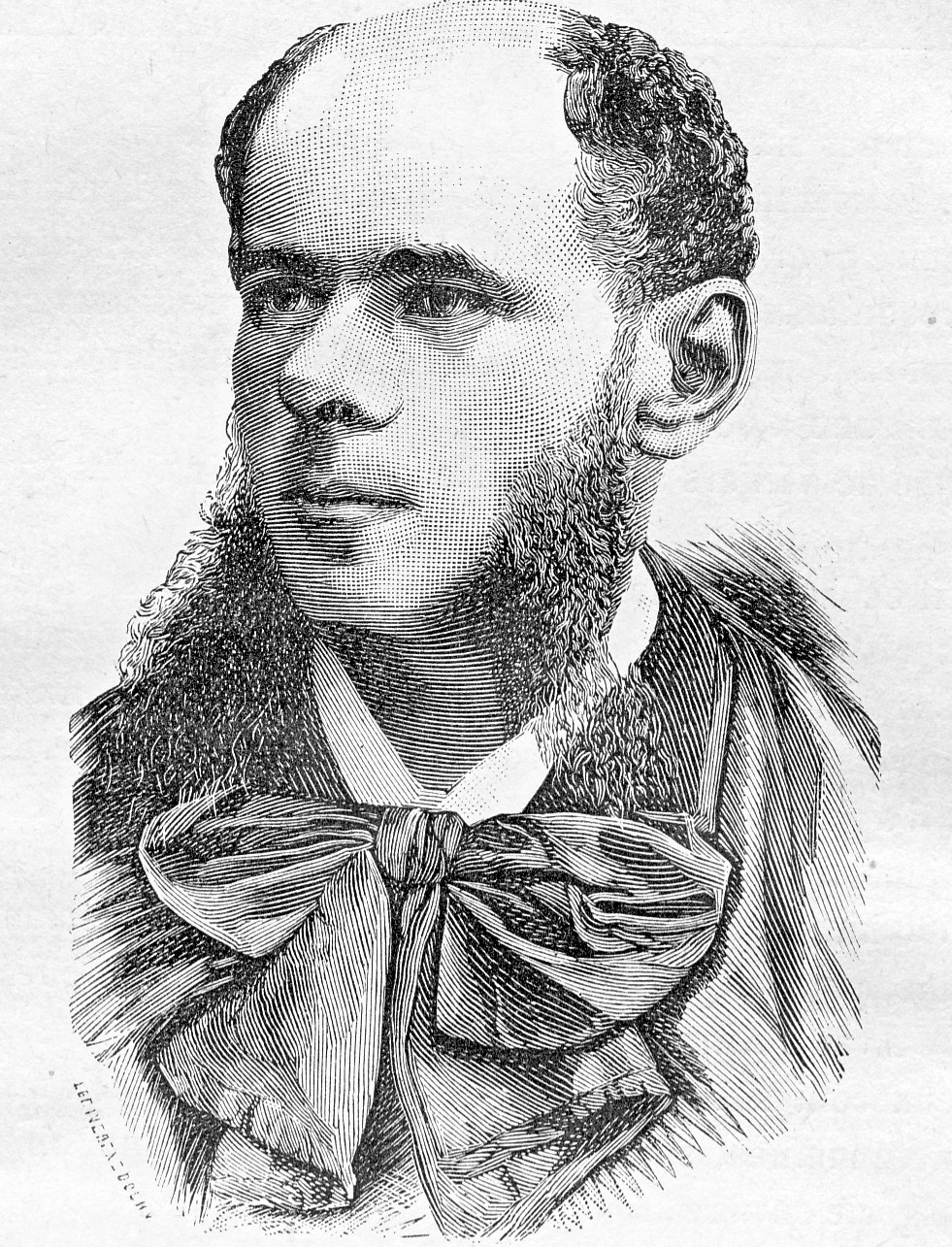
Lieutenant de vaisseau Dehorter, Triomphante, mortally wounded at Tamsui on 8 October 1884

The Chinese and French were separated by a distance of about 100 metres (330 ft). The situation called for regular, controlled volleys by the French, but the excited sailors were firing individually into the bushes, as fast as they could. Boulineau realised that they were simply wasting their ammunition. He repeatedly yelled orders to his men to cease fire, but only a small part of his command could hear him. No bugle signals could be sent, as Boulineau's bugler had been shot dead shortly after the start of the action. The French line continued to waste its ammunition on an elusive target.

The initiative now passed decisively to the Chinese. General Zhang's troops kept up their pressure on the French left, working their way around the flank of Bayard's company. General Sun's regulars also began to lap around the company from Triomphante on the French right flank, issuing out of the White Fort in large numbers. To deal with the threat to the French left, Deman took part of his company out of the front line and brought it up in support of Fontaine's men. On the right the sailors from Triomphante made a series of charges to hold back Sun's troops.

The pressure on the French line now began to tell. The French had been engaged for an hour, and had used up two-thirds of their ammunition. As the number of wounded rose, men had to be detailed to take them back to the beach. The French line also began to drift backwards. Any hope of stemming the retreat disappeared when several French officers fell in close succession. Lieutenant de vaisseau Fontaine of La Galissonnière was wounded in the foot close to the Chinese positions on the left of the French line, where the enemy fire from both front and flank was heaviest, and fell not far from the Chinese lines. Two sailors tried to bring him in, but all three men were captured by the Chinese and immediately beheaded. Enseigne de vaisseau Deman was wounded close by, and on the French right flank lieutenant de vaisseau Dehorter of Triomphante was also mortally wounded.

Fontaine and Dehorter's fall was decisive. Both French flanks gave way. The landing company from Triomphante was now almost out of ammunition, and could no longer resist the pressure from Sun Kaihua's troops. On the left Bayard's company was at one point cut off from the rest of the French line by Zhang Gaoyuan's men and had to charge to disengage itself.

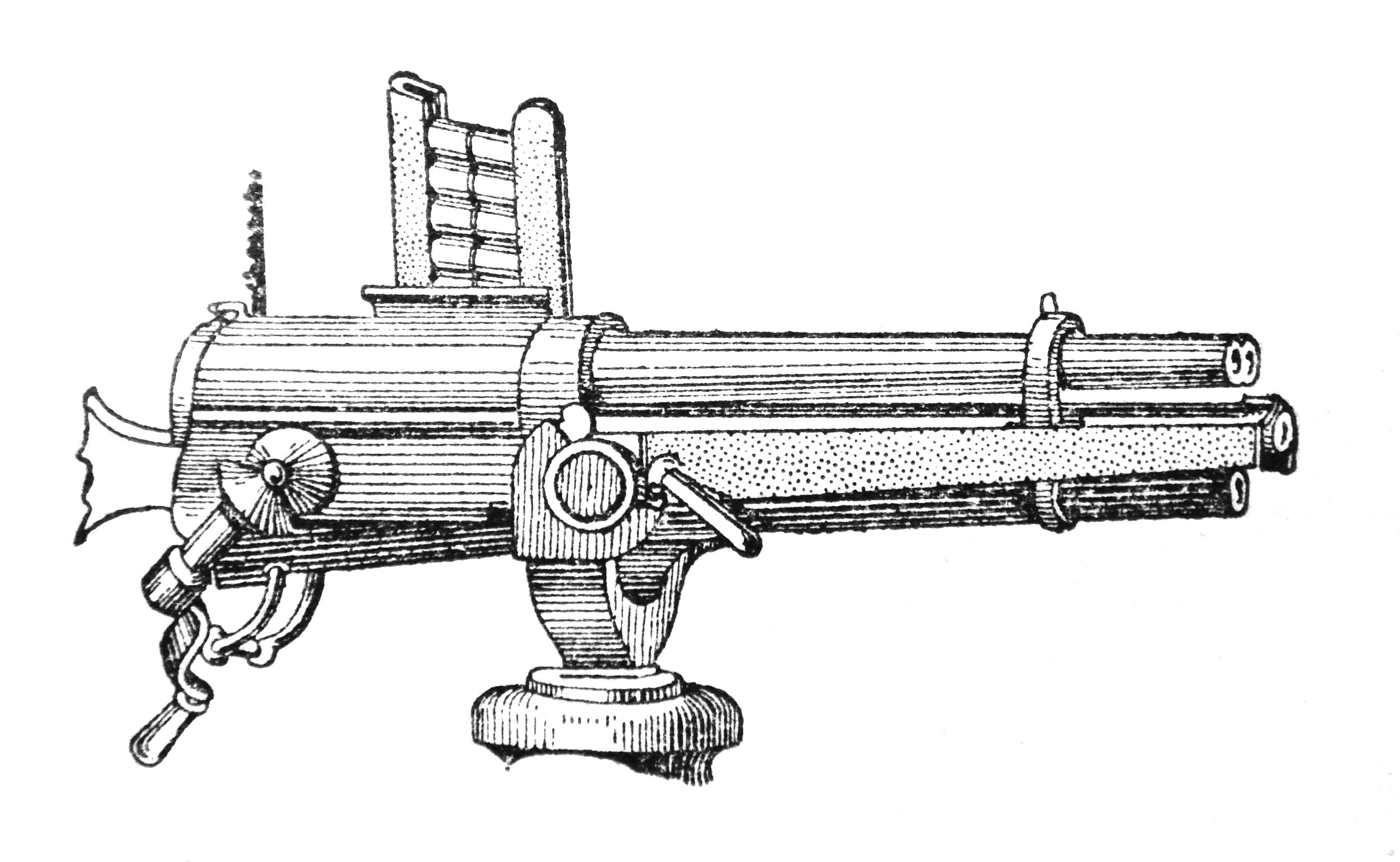
The Hotchkiss rapid fire 37 mm multi-barrelled "canon-revolver", manufactured from 1879

At midday Boulineau gave the order for retreat. The landing companies fell back to the shore, bringing their wounded and some of their dead with them. Nearly one man in every ten had been wounded, and the retreat was necessarily slow. It was covered by the landing companies of La Galissonnière and Triomphante, which fell back slowly, in good order, firing measured volleys to keep the Chinese at a distance. The French had to leave several of their dead behind during the retreat, including the bodies of Lieutenant Fontaine and his two helpers.

The re-embarkation began shortly afterwards. The sea had become very rough, and the boats were unable to ground. The sailors on the beach had to wade out in water up to their necks to embark. As the sailors crowded together in the choppy water, the landing force was at the mercy of a well-timed Chinese attack. Fortunately for the French, the Chinese came up slowly and did little to hinder the evacuation. During the confusion, as the French sailors struggled to clamber aboard the boats, one of the launches capsized, tipping all its occupants into the sea. The Hotchkiss canon-revolver mounted at its bow also fell overboard. The launch was soon righted but the French had to abandon the Hotchkiss, which was later recovered by the Chinese and displayed as a trophy of victory.

Lieutenant de vaisseau Augustin Boué de Lapeyrère of Vipère realised the potential danger of a Chinese counter-attack, and was given permission by Lespès to move his small gunboat to a position close inshore to cover the French withdrawal. From there it fired shells to keep the Chinese at a distance.

At half past midday the first boats put out from the shore and steered towards the French ships. By 1:10 pm, they had all left the beach. Vipère followed them slowly, firing at increasingly long range at the Chinese troops on the shore. At 1:30 pm the boats reached the ships. The sea was now very rough, and the wounded cried out in pain as their comrades helped them up the ladders onto the ships' decks.

== Aftermath ==
The failure of the attack was an embarrassing setback to the French. Captain Garnot later blamed the defeat on the small size of the landing force, and on the use of naval landing companies rather than trained infantry:

There is no doubt that the main reason for the repulse was that the landing force was too small, but poor tactics also played their part. There was no vanguard to cover the advance of the line of battle. The firing line advanced without a preliminary reconnaissance into difficult terrain, under fire from Chinese snipers who were well dug-in and protected. Confusion and lack of direction was evident in the conduct of the battle. The courage and dash shown by our officers and sailors, who had not been trained for a land battle, cannot conceal the fact that we opened fire in a disorderly manner; that the reserves came up to join the line of battle prematurely, without orders; and that our troops lost our heads, firing wildly at the enemy and using up their ammunition in a few minutes. Infantry tactics cannot simply be improvised, as our landing companies learned by bitter experience.

— Garnot, L' expédition française de Formose

The French defeat left them stuck on the northern part, unable to advance or capture more land. (Note: According to Elleman: "Following this setback, the Qing court officially declared war on France on 26 August 1884. On 1 October, Admiral Courbet landed at Keelung with 2,250 men, and the city fell to the French. Chinese forces continued to encircle Keelung throughout the rest of the War. Although a French blockade thwarted all subsequent Chinese efforts to send a fleet to relieve Taiwan, the French troops never succeeded in taking the riverside town of Danshui (Tamsui) in Taiwan's northwestern coastal plain, immediately north of modern-day Taipei. As a result, French control over Taiwan was limited merely to the northern coast. China's central fleet, based in Jiangsu Province, proved unable to break through Admiral Courbet's blockade of Taiwan. Although the south quickly requested assistance from the northern fleet, Li Hongzhang refused to place his own ships in danger. This decision almost guaranteed that China's coastal waters would be dominated by the French.")

== Casualties ==
French casualties at Tamsui were 17 dead and 49 wounded. (Note: The casualties among individual ships' companies were distributed as follows: La Galissonnière, 9 dead, 9 wounded; Triomphante, 4 dead, 17 wounded; Duguay-Trouin, 4 wounded; Châteaurenault, 7 wounded; Tarn, 2 dead, 4 wounded; Bayard, 3 wounded; d'Estaing, 2 dead, 5 wounded.) The French wounded were evacuated to Keelung aboard Tarn on 9 October and were then taken to Saigon aboard the state transport Nive. Lieutenant Dehorter, mortally wounded, was brought back to the French ships and evacuated with the other wounded. He died aboard Nive on 12 October while the transport was still at sea, and his remains were buried in Saigon.

The French dead also included lieutenant de vaisseau Fontaine of La Galissonnière. The French were unable to recover Fontaine's body nor those of two French sailors killed nearby. The bodies of the three dead Frenchmen, abandoned on the battlefield, were beheaded by the Chinese, and the severed heads were paraded through Tamsui on the evening of 8 October by the victorious Chinese army. Captain Boteler of HMS Cockchafer and the British consul Frater complained strongly to Sun Kaihua about the lack of respect shown to the French dead, and the three severed heads were handed over to them for Christian burial. The Chinese took prisoner and beheaded 11 French marines who were injured in addition to La Gailissonniere's captain, Fontaine, and used bamboo poles to display the heads in public. To incite anti-French feelings in China, pictures of the decapitation of the Frenchmen were published in the Tien-shih-tsai Pictorial Journal in Shanghai.

Chinese casualties, according to European employees of the Tamsui customs, were 80 dead and around 200 wounded.

The New Zealand Wanganui Chronicle reported that the Chinese beheaded and killed around 20 Frenchmen.

== Commemoration ==
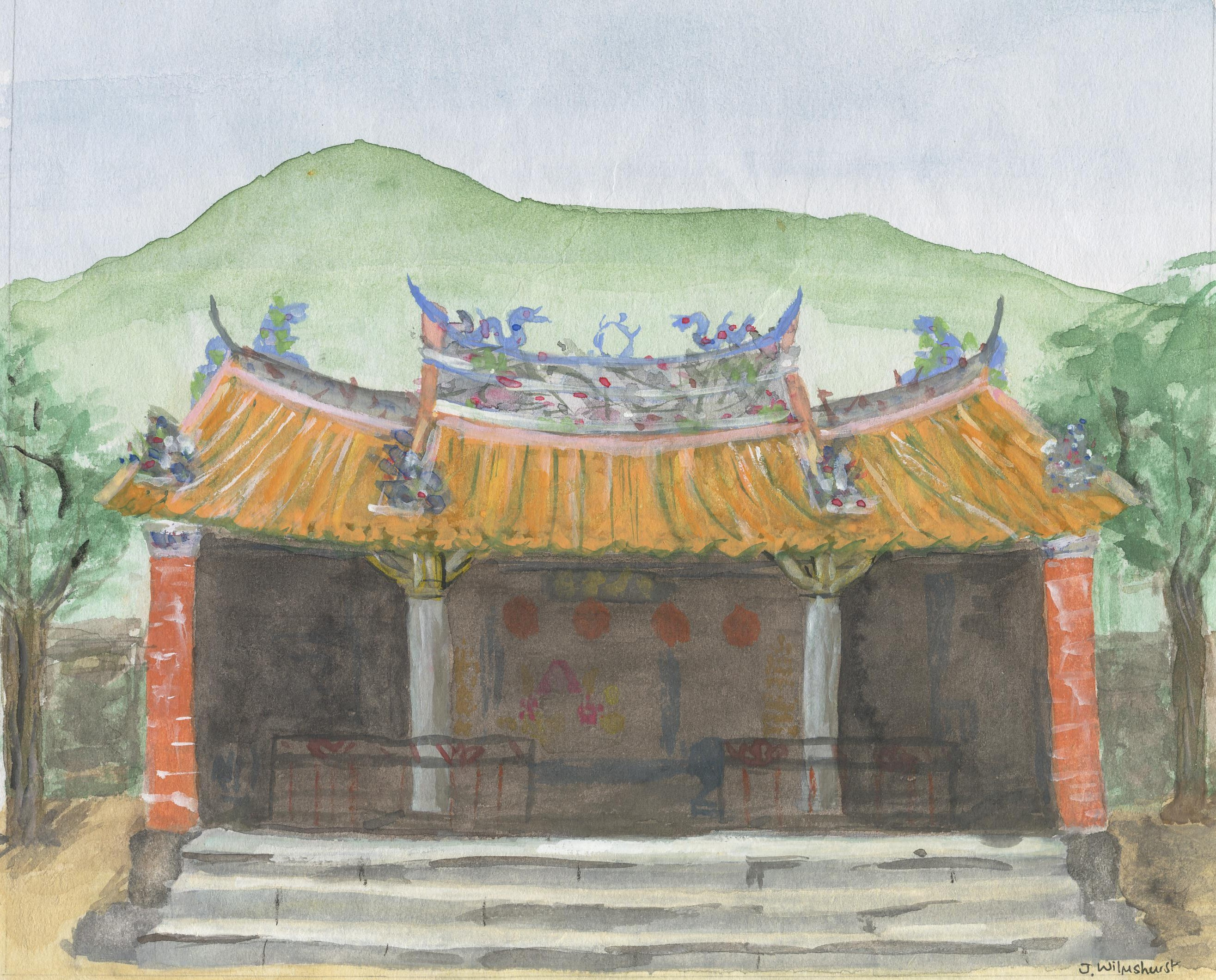
The Fuyou Temple, Tamsui's temple of Mazu

The French defeat at Tamsui on 8 October 1884 was widely publicised in China, and had a far greater effect on national morale than the simultaneous French victories in Tonkin during the Kép Campaign (6–10 October 1884). A detailed account of the battle by Liu Mingchuan, which absurdly multiplied French casualties, was published in the Peking Gazette in November 1884. In this report, Liu claimed that 300 French troops had been killed:

The French fleet being stationed off Taipei, Hobe and other places, the French troops made a vigorous attack on 8 October and landed. Sun K'ai-hua, provincial commander-in-chief, advanced by different routes to attack them with the forces under his command. Chang Kao-yuan, provincial commander-in-chief, and others also led their divisions against the enemy. The French troops were repulsed, and again advanced several times, but our troops engaged them at close quarters, Sun K'ai-hua making a direct advance upon them with his men, and beheading the officer bearing the standard, which he captured, besides killing about 300 of the enemy.

— Davidson, The Island of Formosa, Past and Present

The Chinese victory is still commemorated in Tamsui. Sun Kaihua owed his victory to the intervention of the Chinese sea goddess Mazu, the deified form of the medieval Fujianese shamaness Lin Moniang, revered by the seafaring Chinese and their descendants in Taiwan. On receiving Liu Mingchuan's report of the victory, the Guangxu Emperor observed with satisfaction, "The goddess has been kind to my people and kind to myself". A wooden commemorative tablet in the Fuyou Temple, (Note: Chinese: t 福佑宮, s 福佑宫, Fúyòu Gōng.) a Matsu temple in Tamsui completed in 1796, bears the inscription "Bright Heaven's Blessing" (Note: Chinese: 翌天昭佑, yì tiān zhāo yòu.) in allusion to the emperor's words.

== Significance ==
The French defeat at Tamsui was of considerable political significance. China's war party had been placed on the defensive after the loss of China's Fujian fleet in the Battle of Fuzhou on 23 August 1884, but the unexpected Chinese victory at Tamsui six weeks later bolstered the position of the hardliners in the Qing court. A court conference convened by the Empress Dowager Cixi on 28 October decided to continue the war against France until the French withdrew their demand for the payment of an indemnity for the Bắc Lệ ambush. On 5 November the Qing court offered the French peace terms so extreme that they had no chance whatsoever of being accepted. They included demands for the cancellation of the Tientsin Accord, the abandonment by France of its protectorate over Annam and Tonkin, and the continuing occupation of Lào Cai, Cao Bằng and Lạng Sơn by Chinese troops. The British foreign secretary Lord Granville, who was seeking to mediate the dispute between France and China, described the Chinese terms as 'those from a victor to the vanquished' and refused to transmit them to the French. The intransigence of the Qing court ensured that the Sino-French War would continue for several more months, with increasing losses and expenditure on both sides.

== Bibliography ==
- Campbell, William (1915). Sketches from Formosa. London: Marshall Brothers. OL 7051071M.
- Davidson, James W. (1903). The Island of Formosa, Past and Present : history, people, resources, and commercial prospects : tea, camphor, sugar, gold, coal, sulphur, economical plants, and other productions. London and New York: Macmillan & co. OL 6931635M.
- Duboc. Émile Charles Eutrope (1898). 35 mois de campagne en Chine, au Tonkin. Paris: Charavay, Mantoux, Martin. hdl:2027/mdp.39015021700557. OCLC 9328158.
- Eastman, Lloyd E. (1967). Throne and Mandarins: China's Search for a Policy during the Sino-French Controversy, 1880-1885. Cambridge: Harvard University Press. ISBN 9780674891159. OCLC 575485068. OL 5535411M.
- Ferrero, Stéphane (2005). Formose vue par un marin français du XIX^{e} siècle. Paris: Harmattan. ISBN 9782747594158.
- Garnot, Eugène Germain (1894). L' expédition française de Formose, 1884-1885. Paris: Librairie C. Delagrave. hdl:2027/uc1.$b579446. OCLC 3986575. OL 5225244M.
- Loir, Maurice (1886). L'escadre de l'amiral Courbet. Paris: Berger-Levrault. LCCN 03013530. OCLC 23421595.
- Lung, Chang (1993). 越南與中法戰爭 [Vietnam and the Sino-French War] (in Chinese). Taipei: 臺灣商務印書館. ISBN 9789570513141.
- Mackay, George L. (1896). From Far Formosa. New York: F. H. Revell Co. OCLC 855518794.
- Poyen-Bellisle, Isidore Henry de (1888). L'artillerie de la Marine à Formose. Paris. OCLC 752993458.
- Rollet de l'Isle, M. (1886). Au Tonkin et dans les mers de Chine. OCLC 12425765. OL 23279748M.
- Rouil, Christophe (2001). Formose: des batailles presque oubliées. Taipei. ISBN 9789578820050.
- Thomazi, Auguste (1934). La conquête de l'Indochine. Paris: Payot. OCLC 4422548. OL 6313805M.
- Tsai, Shih-shan Henry (2009). Maritime Taiwan: Historical Encounters with the East and the West (illustrated ed.). M.E. Sharpe. ISBN 9780765623287. Archived from the original on Jul 13, 2010.
- 黃振南 (1994). 中法戰爭史熱點問題聚焦 (in Chinese). 廣西人民出版社. ISBN 7-219-02629-3.
