= Maoqiang =

Local folk opera style from the Jiaozhou area of Shandong Peninsula in Eastern China

Maoqiang opera (Chinese: 茂腔; pinyin: Màoqiāng) is a local folk opera style from the Jiaozhou area of the Shandong Peninsula (Jiaodong Peninsula) in eastern China. It has been listed as a national-level intangible cultural heritage item since 2006.

Maoqiang opera has a history of about 200 years and has incorporated local folk songs and dances from the region. Musical instruments used include drum, cymbal, gong, jinghu, suona, flute, and sheng. The main roles are shared with Peking opera: sheng (生, main male roles), dan (旦, female roles), and chou (丑, male clown). There more than 140 Maoqiang plays including "Dongjing", "Xijing", "Nanjing", "Beijing", and "Luoshanji" and the opera is particularly popular in the cities of Qingdao, Yantai, Rizhao, Weifang, and Gaomi.

The novel "Sandalwood Death" by Chinese writer Mo Yan is written in the style of the Maoqiang opera.
