= Sun Kaihua =

Late Qing Dynasty Chinese soldier (died 1893)

- Traditional Chinese: 孫開華
Transcriptions
Standard Mandarin
- Hanyu Pinyin: Sūn Kāihuá
- Wade–Giles: Sun Kʻai-hua

Sun Kaihua (died 1893) was a military student of Hunan, who joined Bao Chao's army and fought against the Taiping and Nien rebels, during which time he was wounded. He was rapidly promoted until he became a Brigade General at Zhangzhou in Fujian in 1866. In 1878 he saw service against the Taiwanese aborigines, but he is best known for his repulse of the French at the Battle of Tamsui in 1884. For this he was made a noble of the 7th grade, and in 1886 became Commander-in-Chief in Fujian. As a military officer he was well educated, and was popular with foreigners and Chinese alike. Orders were issued that his career was to be recorded in the history of the dynasty, and memorial temples were to be erected at the scenes of his chief exploits.
