= Cangkou =

Neighbourhood in Qingdao, China

Coordinates: 36°9′48.77″N 120°22′33.28″E

Cangkou (simplified Chinese: 沧口; traditional Chinese: 滄口; pinyin: Cāngkǒu) is a neighbourhood in the Licang District of Qingdao, Shandong, China. It was an administrative district of Qingdao from 1951 to 1994.

In 1938 the site of Guchengding (古城顶遗址) was dug over during a fight.

It is the location of the Qingdao Cangkou Air Base and the nearby Qingdaobei Railway Station.
