= Sébastien Lespès =

French admiral

Sébastien-Nicolas-Joachim Lespès
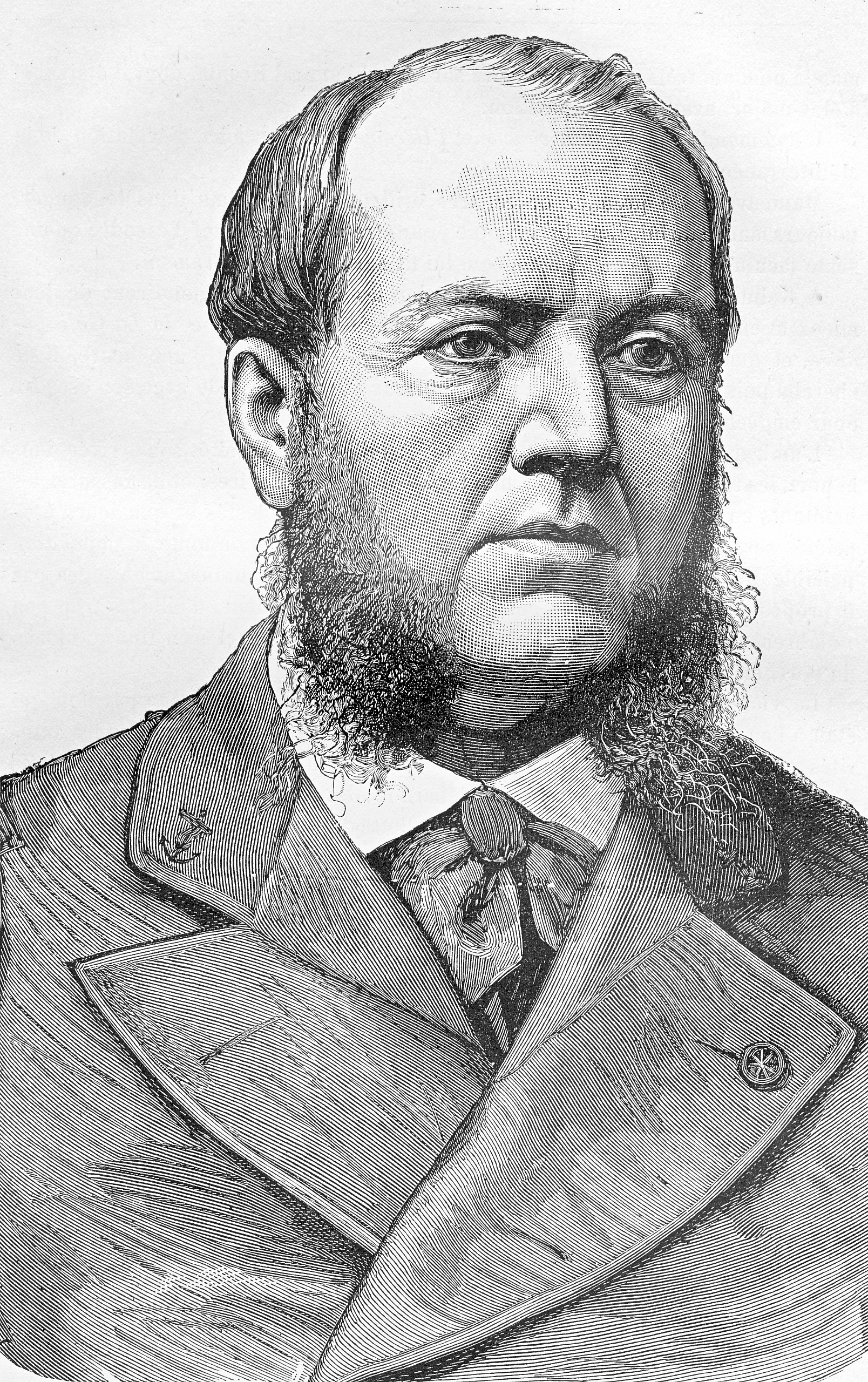
- Born: 13 March 1828; Bayonne
- Died: 24 August 1897 (aged 69)
- Allegiance: France
- Branch: French Navy
- Rank: Vice Admiral
- Conflicts: Crimean War; Siege of Sebastopol; Second Opium War; Cochinchina campaign Sino-French War; Keelung Campaign; Battle of Tamsui

Sébastien-Nicolas-Joachim Lespès (French pronunciation: [sebastjɛ̃ nikɔlɑ ʒɔ.aʃɛ̃ lɛspɛ]; 13 March 1828 – 24 August 1897) was a French admiral who played an important role in naval operations during the Sino-French War (August 1884–April 1885), as second-in-command of Admiral Amédée Courbet's Far East Squadron.

== Early career ==
Sébastien Lespès was born on 13 March 1828 at Bayonne (Basses-Pyrénées). He attended the École Navale, passing out as a midshipman (aspirant) on 1 August 1846. In 1850, after serving successively on the warships Inflexible, Friedland, Océan and Psyché with the escadre d'évolution, he took part in the Senegal campaign aboard the brig Aigle. He received his promotion to enseigne de vaisseau during the course of this campaign, on 26 October 1850.

During the Crimean War (1854-6) he saw service aboard the warship Valmy in the Black Sea, and also distinguished himself ashore with the French naval batteries at the Siege of Sebastopol. He was promoted lieutenant de vaisseau on 2 December 1854, and was also made a Knight in the Order of the Legion of Honour.

He was posted to the Far East in 1857 and saw active service in the Second Opium War and the Cochinchina campaign, serving successively aboard the warships Audacieux, Némésis, Dordogne and Duchayla. He was present with Némésis at the attack on the Pei-ho forts and at the capture of Da Nang (September 1858), and with Duchayla at the capture of the Kien Chan forts during the Siege of Tourane (18 November 1859).

In April 1860 he was appointed to the command of the aviso Norzagaray and given the task of scouting the river routes of Cambodia.

He was promoted capitaine de frégate on 27 January 1864 and took part in the Iceland campaign, for two summers, as second officer of Pandore. He was then appointed by Commandant Jules d'Ariès as chief of staff of the West Coast naval division (division navale du littoral ouest de la France).

In 1869 he sailed for Shanghai with the corvette Dupleix as flag captain and chief of staff to Rear Admiral Krantz, who had recently assumed command of the China and Japan Seas naval division. He therefore saw no action during the Franco-Prussian War (1870–71). In the early 1870s Dupleix left the division to undergo repairs, and was replaced by Montcalm. Lespès remained in command of Montcalm until 1876.

During this tour of duty in the Far East, on 20 May 1873, Lespès was promoted capitaine de vaisseau.

In 1876, following his return to Toulon, he assumed command of the frigate Revanche, one of the warships of escadre d'évolution. Revanche was seriously damaged by a boiler explosion in May 1877, and Lespès was subsequently given command of the ironclad Héroïne, also with the squadron of evolutions (May 1877–May 1878).

During the next five years Lespès held two important administrative posts on the Council of Works (Conseil des travaux de la marine) and the Conseil d'Amirauté. He also held successive command of the first-class ironclads Redoutable and Amiral Duperré.

He was promoted rear admiral (contre-amiral) on 7 December 1881.

== Command of Far East naval division ==
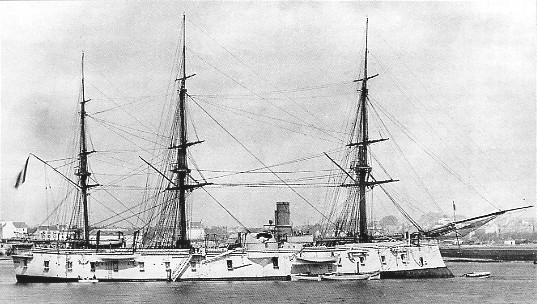
The French ironclad La Galissonnière (4,585 tons), flagship of the Far East naval division

On 7 March 1884 Lespès arrived in Hong Kong aboard his flagship La Galissonnière to replace Admiral Charles Meyer in command of France's Far East naval division. After his arrival the naval division consisted of the ironclads La Galissonnière and Triomphante, the cruisers d'Estaing, Duguay-Trouin and Volta, and the gunboat Lutin.

The Tonkin Coasts and Far East naval divisions were both placed under Admiral Courbet's command in July 1884, as war with China loomed, and the two divisions were formally united into a Far East Squadron in August 1884.

== Sino-French War ==
Lespès did not possess Admiral Courbet's tactical brilliance, and his record as a naval commander during the Sino-French War was mixed. On 5 August 1884 he successfully destroyed the Chinese forts at Keelung, and landed a force of sailors to occupy the town. On 6 August the Chinese counterattacked, and Lespès was forced to re-embark his landing force.

On 29 August 1884, while Courbet's squadron was fighting its way successfully down the Min River after its victory in the Battle of Fuzhou, Lespès came up from Keelung with his flagship La Galissonnière and attempted to force his way into the river. La Galissonnière came under fire from the Chinese forts at the entrance to the river, received several hits, and was forced to withdraw.

On 8 October 1884 Lespès was in overall command of the French attack on Tamsui, which was ignominiously repulsed by the Chinese. The Battle of Tamsui was an embarrassing defeat for the French, and Courbet seems to have realised the limitations of his subordinate commander. Thereafter Lespès was given relatively unexacting duties. In February and early March 1885, while Courbet hunted down several Chinese ships of the Nanyang Fleet and brought them to action in the Battle of Shipu and the Battle of Zhenhai, Lespès was left in command of the blockade of Formosa. In late March 1885, in the Pescadores Campaign, Courbet took personal command of the naval expedition. Again, Lespès was left behind to direct the blockades of Formosa and the Yangzi River.

== Command of the Far East Squadron ==
After Courbet's death on 11 June 1885, Lespès briefly assumed command of the Far East Squadron. He delivered a moving tribute to his predecessor at a memorial service for Courbet at Makung on 13 June attended by the sailors of the Far East Squadron and the marine infantry of the Formosa expeditionary corps that had fought the Pescadores Campaign. His command lasted just over a month. On 25 July 1885 the French government reconstituted the traditional Far East naval division at close to its 1883 strength, and Lespès resumed command of his old division, with Admiral Adrien-Barthélémy-Louis Rieunier as his second-in-command. The postwar Far East naval division consisted of the ironclads La Galissonnière (Lespès' flagship), Turenne (Rieunier's flagship) and Triomphante, the cruisers Lapérousse, Primauguet, Champlain and Roland, and the gunboats Vipère and Sagittaire.

== Personality and views ==
Lespès tended to make a good impression on those who made his acquaintance. On 9 August 1884, four days after the French bombardment of the Keelung forts, the Canadian missionary George MacKay was invited aboard La Galissonnière in Keelung harbour and met Lespès. MacKay, who was accompanied by a Taiwanese student, was struck by the French admiral's humanity:

Four days after the bombardment, in company with an Englishman, I went around the coast in a steamship, and was allowed to go on shore to examine the smoking fortifications. Soldiers were lying on their faces, with bodies shattered. Evidently they had been fleeing when exploded shells ended their lives. These shells were sent with such terrific force as to cut off branches of a tree that were half a foot in diameter. A magazine that had exploded hurled masses of concrete to an incredible distance. The Englishman and myself, with one of my students, were invited on board the flagship La Galissonair and taken through every part of the vessel. When we went down below our attention was directed to three holes, nearly a foot in diameter, just above the surface of the water, made by shells from the Chinese fort. The vice-admiral spoke in the highest terms of the gunners who aimed so truly. Though he was a man of war, this officer was also a man of sympathy; for when my student looked afraid as the soldiers under drill and their officers dashed to and fro with swords dangling at their sides, he said, 'Poor fellow! Tell him not to be afraid. We have no pleasure in killing people.'

Lespès was a reflective and sensitive man, with a good deal of human sympathy. According to Captain Fournier of the French cruiser Éclaireur, who met George MacKay in Keelung on the eve of the French evacuation in June 1885, Lespès had made no secret of his distaste for Jules Ferry's aggressive policy towards China, and believed that France should not have fought the Sino-French War. This was also Fournier's view (he called the coercion of China 'a disgusting affair'), though it was not an opinion espoused by the majority of the officers of the Far East Squadron.
