= French cruiser Châteaurenault (1868) =

Steam corvette of the French Navy

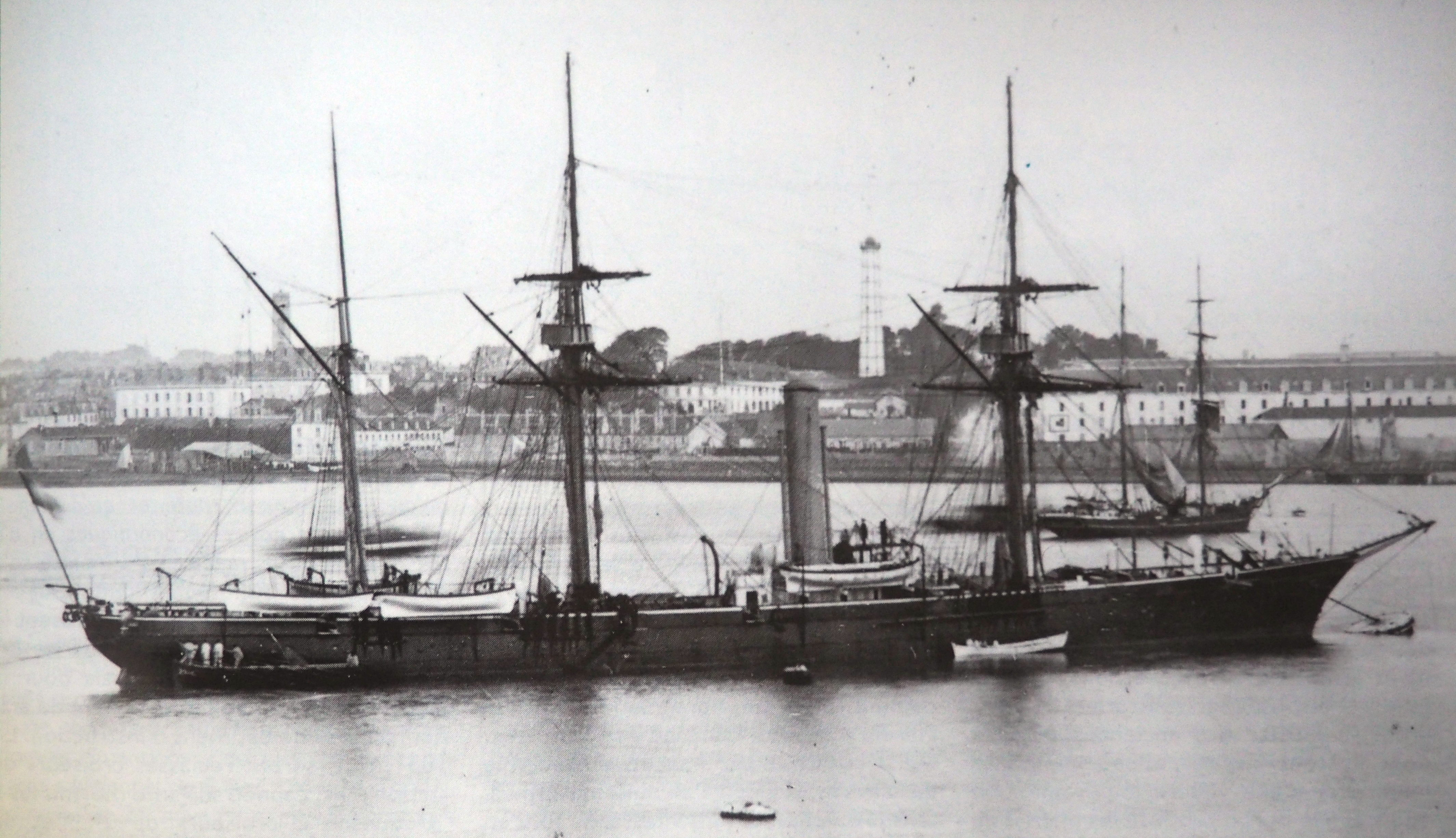
- Châteaurenault anchored in Lorient. Photo by Marius Bar.

History

France
- Name: Châteaurenault
- Namesake: François Louis de Rousselet, Marquis de Châteaurenault
- Builder: Augustin Normand, Le Havre
- Laid down: 19 November 1866
- Launched: 20 July 1868
- Commissioned: 1 September 1869
- Stricken: 16 May 1892
- Renamed: Onglet 1895
- Fate: Hulked 1895; Scrapped 1903

General characteristics
- Type: Corvette
- Displacement: 1,830 tons; 1,979 tons full load
- Length: 78.18 m (256 ft 6 in)
- Beam: 10.74 m (35 ft 3 in)
- Draught: 5.74 m (18 ft 10 in)
- Speed: 14.27 knots (26.43 km/h; 16.42 mph)
- Complement: 202 to 210
- Armament: originally: 5 x 16 cm gun model 1868; from 1879: 7 × 14 cm guns model 1870

Châteaurenault was a steam corvette (Note: Châteaurenault would over the years go through several designations calling her a"cruiser", a "2nd-class cruiser", and eventually a "3rd-class cruiser" (cf Demerliac)) of the French Navy. Originally designed as a commerce raider, she notably served in the Mediterranean during the tense era before the Russo-Ottoman War of 1877–1878, and took part in the Tonkin campaign and the Sino-French War.

== History ==
From 1857, the French Navy started to envision a series of swift, unarmoured commerce raiders. This arose out of two influences. One was the abolition of privateering, which deprived France of a way to interdict enemy commerce in wartime. The other was the introduction of a new generation of steam-powered frigates, such as Cassard, which brought new capabilities for long-range missions.

Châteaurenault was built on an 1850 design by Mangin, similar to that of Dupleix and Cosmao. Initially named Coquette, she was renamed to Châteaurenault on 18 March 1867, while still under construction, and was launched on 20 July 1868.

She was part of the Northern Squadron from 1870, and took part in the blockade of Germany during the Franco-Prussian War.

In January 1871, she sailed to Halifax for a mission to secure fishing activities off Newfoundland, making a port call in New York from March to April 1871. In March 1872, she sailed to Fort-de-France to serve in the Caribbean stations. On 6 November 1872, she left for Cherbourg, where she was decommissioned.

Recommissioned in December 1873, she sailed to Smyrna to serve with the Levant station. In July 1875, she sailed to Toulon for a refit, before returning to the Levant station. In May 1876, Châteaurenault sailed with the 2nd Division of the Escadre d'Évolution to Tessaloniki in the aftermath of the Salonika Incident. She then returned to Smyrna.

In 1877, she returned to Lorient. Recommissioned in March 1879, she sailed to serve with the Caribbean station again. She returned to Lorient for a refit in May 1881.

In June 1883, she was appointed to the Tonkin division and sailed to the Far East by way of Algiers, Port Saïd and Suez, where she twice ran aground. She arrived in Singapore on 15 July 1883 to take part in the Tonkin campaign. She was part of the squadron that bombarded Vietnamese forts during the Battle of Thuận An, and took part in the Battle of Fuzhou in August 1884 under capitaine de frégate Le Pontois. After a refit in Saigon and a trip to France in 1884, she returned to the Far East and took part in the Pescadores campaign. On 24 March 1885, she took Torpilleur 45 in two and attempted to reach Ningbo, but on 28 March, a storm caused Torpilleur 45 to run aground and to become a total loss.

In September 1885, Châteaurenault returned to Lorient for a refit. In 1887, she undertook a mission to secure fishing operations off Island.

Châteaurenault was struck from the Navy lists on 16 May 1892. In 1895, she was renamed Onglet to serve as a hulk. She was eventually broken up in 1903.

== Legacy ==
The overall layout of Châteaurenault have been published in Alphonse Hauser's Cours de Construction navale (1886), volume 2, illustrated page 334, figure 1676. A plan of the regulator, by Émile Bertin, has been published in Mémorial du Génie maritime, figure 858. The complete plans of the ships are stored at the Service historique de la Marine.

Five photographs of Châteaurenault can be seen in Navires et Histoire, n°29, April 2005, pages 83 to 86.

== Notes and references ==
=== Bibliography ===
- Demerliac, Alain (2004). La Marine de la Deuxième République et du Second Empire: Nomenclature des Navires Français de 1848 à 1871 (in French). Éditions Ancre. ISBN 2-906381-23-3.
- Roche, Jean-Michel (2005). Dictionnaire des bâtiments de la flotte de guerre française de Colbert à nos jours. Vol. 1. Group Retozel-Maury Millau. p. 112. ISBN 978-2-9525917-0-6. OCLC 165892922. (1671-1870)
- Torunoğlu, Berke (2009). "Murder in Salonika, 1876 : a tale of apostasy turned into an international crisis".
- Torunoğlu, Berke (2012). Murder in Salonika, 1876: A Tale of Apostasy and International Crisis. Libra Books.
- Navires et Histoire, n°29, April 2005, pages 83 to 86.
