= Pescadores campaign (1885) =

- Part of the Sino-French War
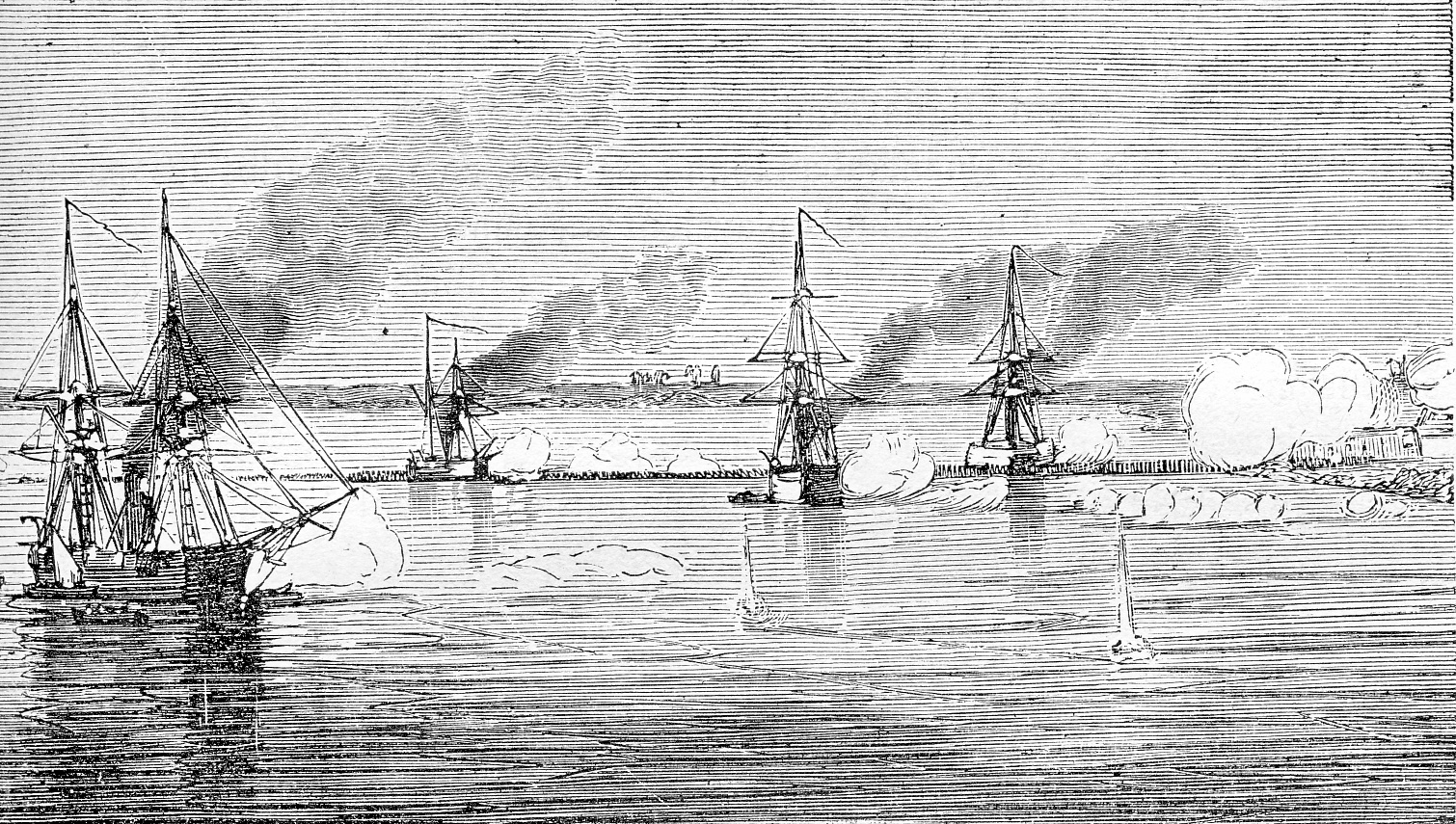
- French warships bombard Chinese positions around Makung, 29 March 1885
| Date | 28 - 31 March 1885 |
| Location | Pescadores Islands |
| Result | French victory |

Belligerents
| France | Qing dynasty |

Commanders and leaders
| Amédée Courbet | (Qing dynasty) Zhou Shanchu (Qing dynasty) Zheng Yingjie |

Strength
| Six warships 400 marine infantry one artillery section | 2,400 men and shore batteries |

Casualties and losses
| 5 killed 12 wounded | 300 killed 500 wounded |

The Pescadores campaign which took place in late March, 1885, was one of the last campaigns of the Sino-French War (August 1884–April 1885). It was fought to capture the Pescadores, a strategically important archipelago off the western coast of Formosa (Taiwan). Admiral Amédée Courbet, with part of the French Far East Squadron, bombarded the Chinese coastal defences around the principal town of Makung on Penghu Island and landed a battalion of marine infantry which routed the Chinese defenders and occupied Makung.

The Pescadores were occupied by the French until July 1885 and Admiral Courbet, by then a national hero in France, died aboard his flagship Bayard in Makung harbour during the occupation.

== Background ==
The Pescadores Islands, also known from their Chinese name as P'eng-hu (澎湖), were an important transit stop for reinforcements to the Chinese army under the command of Liu Mingchuan confronting the French in northern Taiwan around Keelung, and their capture would prevent further reinforcements from reaching Taiwan. Courbet had wanted to mount an expedition to capture the Pescadores for several months, but the feasibility of the operation depended on the progress of the Keelung Campaign. Colonel Jacques Duchesne's defeat of Liu Mingchuan's forces and capture of the key Chinese position of La Table on 7 March 1885 finally disengaged Keelung, allowing the French to detach troops from its garrison for a descent on the Pescadores.

== French and Chinese forces ==
Courbet's flotilla consisted of the ironclads Bayard and Triomphante, the cruisers d'Estaing and Duchaffault, the gunboat Vipère and the troopship Annamite. His landing force consisted of an understrength battalion of marine infantry (400 men as opposed to the usual complement of 600 men) under the command of chef de bataillon Lange and a marine artillery section of two 80-millimetre (3.1 in) mountain guns (Lieutenant Lubert). (Note: Lange's battalion consisted of the 25th, 26th, 27th and 30th Companies, 2nd Marine Infantry Regiment (Captains Logos, Harlay, Cramoisy and Vaillance).)

The Chinese garrison of the Pescadores, which had been substantially reinforced at the beginning of 1885, was commanded by the generals Zhou Shanchu and Zheng Yingjie (鄭膺杰), and numbered around 2,400 men. A number of foreign officers served with the Chinese garrison, including an American officer named Nelson, responsible for the defence of one of the Makung forts, whose diary of events was later recovered by the French. Initially optimistic, by March 1885 Nelson had despaired of training up the Chinese gunners to the standard necessary to meet the French in battle.

The Pescadores Islands were occupied by the French in March 1885

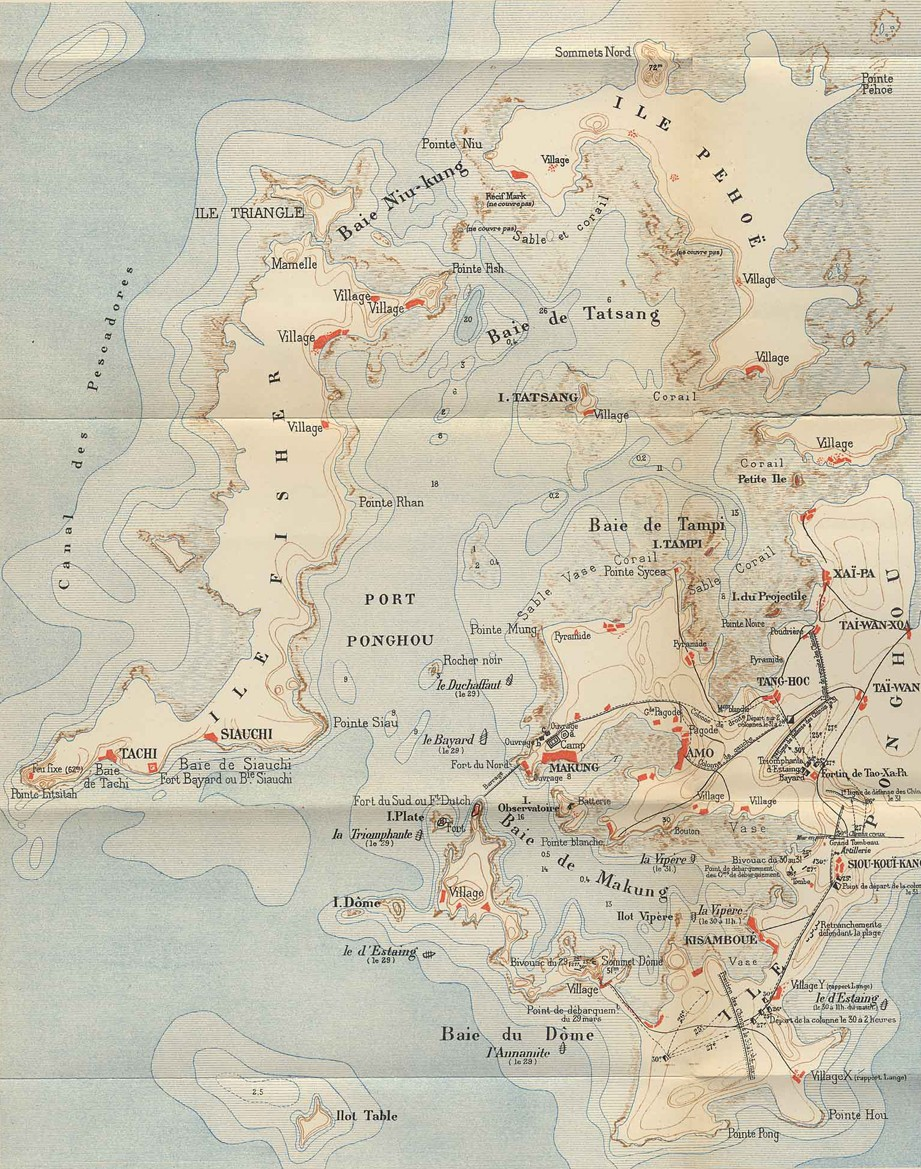
The Pescadores campaign, March 1885 (map by Captain Garnot of the 3rd African Battalion)

The fortifications of the Pescadores were designed primarily to protect Makung and deny entrance to Makung Bay, and also if possible to cover the southern entrance to P'eng-hu Bay, which would have to be traversed first by an attacking squadron. The most formidable obstacles were the two Makung forts, placed on either side of the entrance to Makung Bay. The Northern Fort, just to the southwest of Makung, deployed three Armstrong cannons, and was flanked by a number of subsidiary positions in which the Chinese had deployed a dozen rifled French Voruz cannon of various calibres. The Southern Fort, or Dutch Fort (it had been built by the Dutch in the seventeenth century), was armed with two 22-centimetre (8.7 in) and two 14-centimetre (5.5 in) smoothbore cannon. A third battery, sited on Observatory Island just inside Makung Bay, also covered the entrance to the bay, which had also been blocked by a barrier of chains. The Observatory Island battery was armed with two Armstrong cannon and a Chinese 20-centimetre (7.9 in) cannon. The Chinese had also built a battery armed with smoothbore cannon to sweep the plain to the east of Makung and a large entrenched camp to the north of the town to house the regular troops of the island's garrison.

The outer Chinese defences were much weaker. The southern entrance to P'eng-hu Bay was covered on the west by the Hsiaochi battery on Fisher Island (modern Xiyu), and on the east by a battery on Plate Island. The Hsiaochi battery was replaced in the late 1880s by the Hsi Tai battery, whose ruins can still be seen today. The Plate Island battery was quite close to the Southern Fort, and could also cover the approach to Makung Bay. Unfortunately for the Chinese, both these batteries were armed only with a mixture of antiquated smoothbore pieces that offered little threat to the French squadron.

== The campaign ==
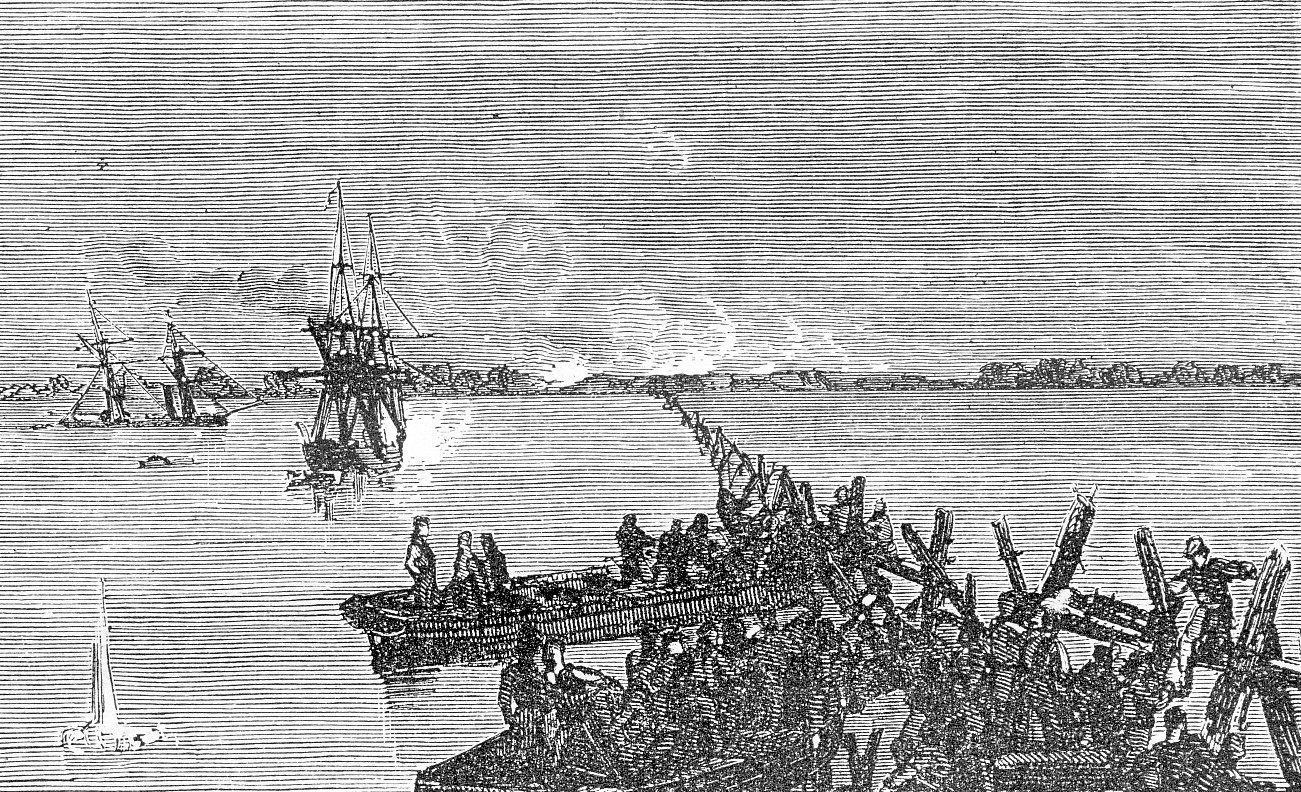
French sailors cut a gap in the Chinese barrage protecting the harbour of Makung, 30 March 1885

The French flotilla concentrated off Taiwanfu (modern Tainan) on 28 March, and approached the Pescadores from the west before dawn on 29 March. During the morning of 29 March the French warships bombarded and silenced the Hsiaochi battery and other Chinese shore batteries guarding the approaches to Makung.

In the late afternoon Lange's battalion was put ashore on the southern cape of P'eng-hu Island, at Dome Hill, where it set up a defensive position for the night. There were no Chinese in sight, and the landing was made without resistance.

During the night of 29 March the French sent boats to scout a barrage of chains thrown across the entrance to Makung harbour. The scouting party discovered that no mines had yet been attached to the chains, and at dawn on 30 March a party of sailors from Bayard went forward in launches to cut a gap in the barrage. Chinese riflemen tried to disrupt this operation, and one French sailor was killed.

With the barrage breached, Courbet's flotilla entered Makung Bay during the morning of 30 March and bombarded the defences of Makung. At the same time, Lange's battalion left its bivouac on Dome Hill and began to advance towards Makung, its flanks covered by d'Estaing and Vipère in Makung Bay and Annamite in Dome Bay. The column was guided towards its objective by an elderly local fisherman, who had volunteered his services for pay. During the afternoon Lange's men cleared a force of Chinese infantry from the village of Kisambo and closed up to the village of Siu-kuei-kang (modern Suogang, 鎖港), which was strongly held by the Chinese. Lange's men bivouacked for the night to the west of the village, ready to attack the Chinese the following morning. During the evening the French column was reinforced by the landing companies of Bayard, Triomphante and d'Estaing and by four 65-millimetre (2.6 in) cannon.

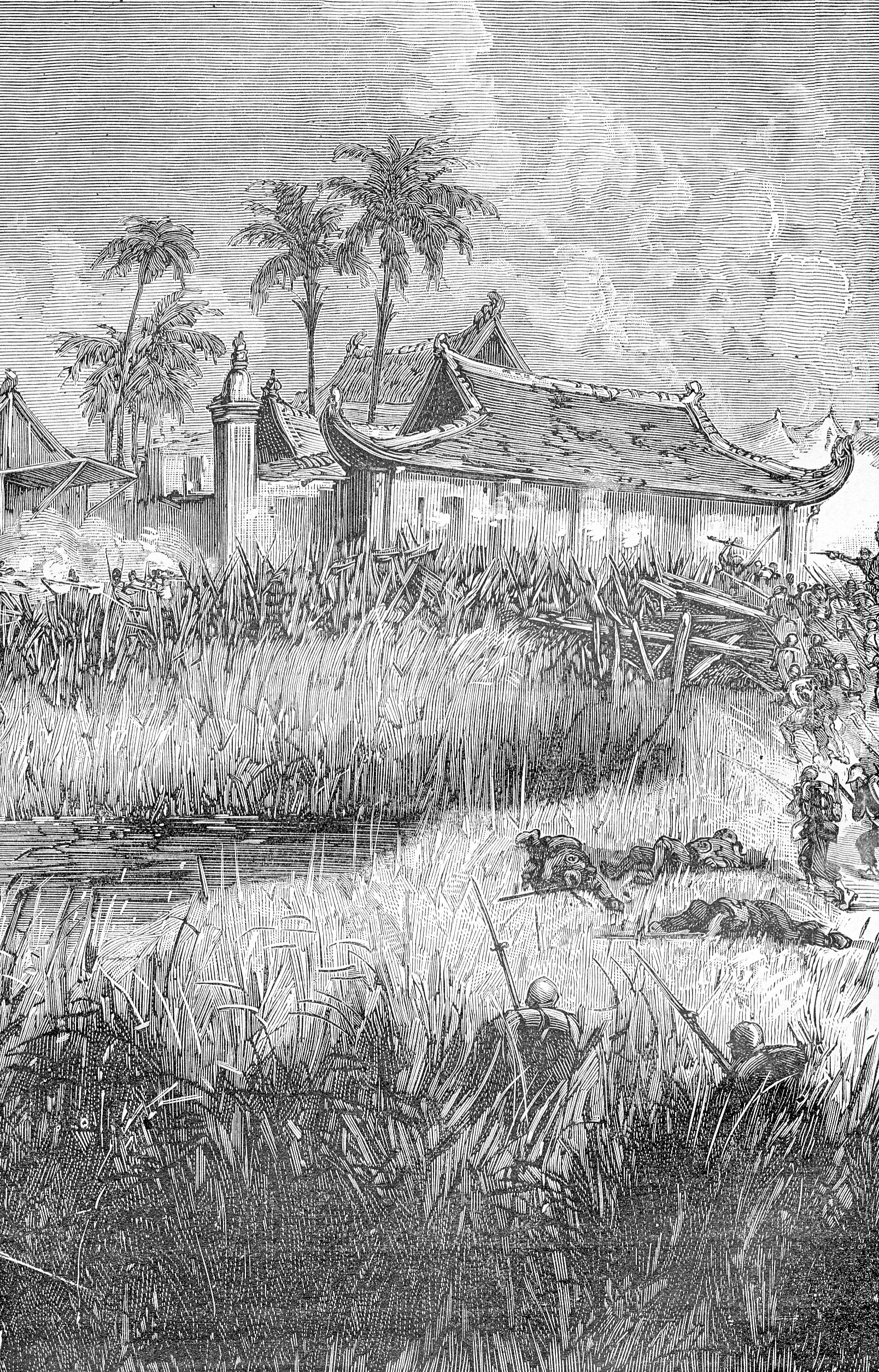
French troops enter Makung, 31 March 1885

On the morning of 31 March Lange attacked the main Chinese defensive line around Siu-kuei-kang. Although the marine infantry and sailors were heavily outnumbered, French naval gunfire tipped the balance in their favour. The Chinese were driven back from their positions and attempted to make a second stand before Makung, near the village of Amo. Lange attacked them again, with equal success, and occupied Makung late in the afternoon.

Most of the defeated Chinese soldiers escaped to Amoy (Xiamen) in mainland China or to Taiwanfu on junks and fishing boats under cover of darkness, though a number of soldiers were caught and handed over to the victorious French by the inhabitants of the Pescadores, who saw no reason to distinguish between two equally unwelcome sets of intruders.

French casualties in the Pescadores campaign were 5 killed and 12 wounded. The wounded included one officer, lieutenant de vaisseau Poirot of Triomphante. Chinese casualties may have amounted to 300 dead and around 400 wounded, and included several senior officers. The French were told by islanders that the American artillery officer Nelson was beheaded during the bombardment of 29 March on the orders of an enraged Chinese commander, because his guns were unable to make any effective reply to the French warships.

The French bombardment of the Chinese positions on the Pescadores was heard in Taiwanfu on the Formosan mainland. The British missionary William Campbell described the impact of the battle on the town's inhabitants:

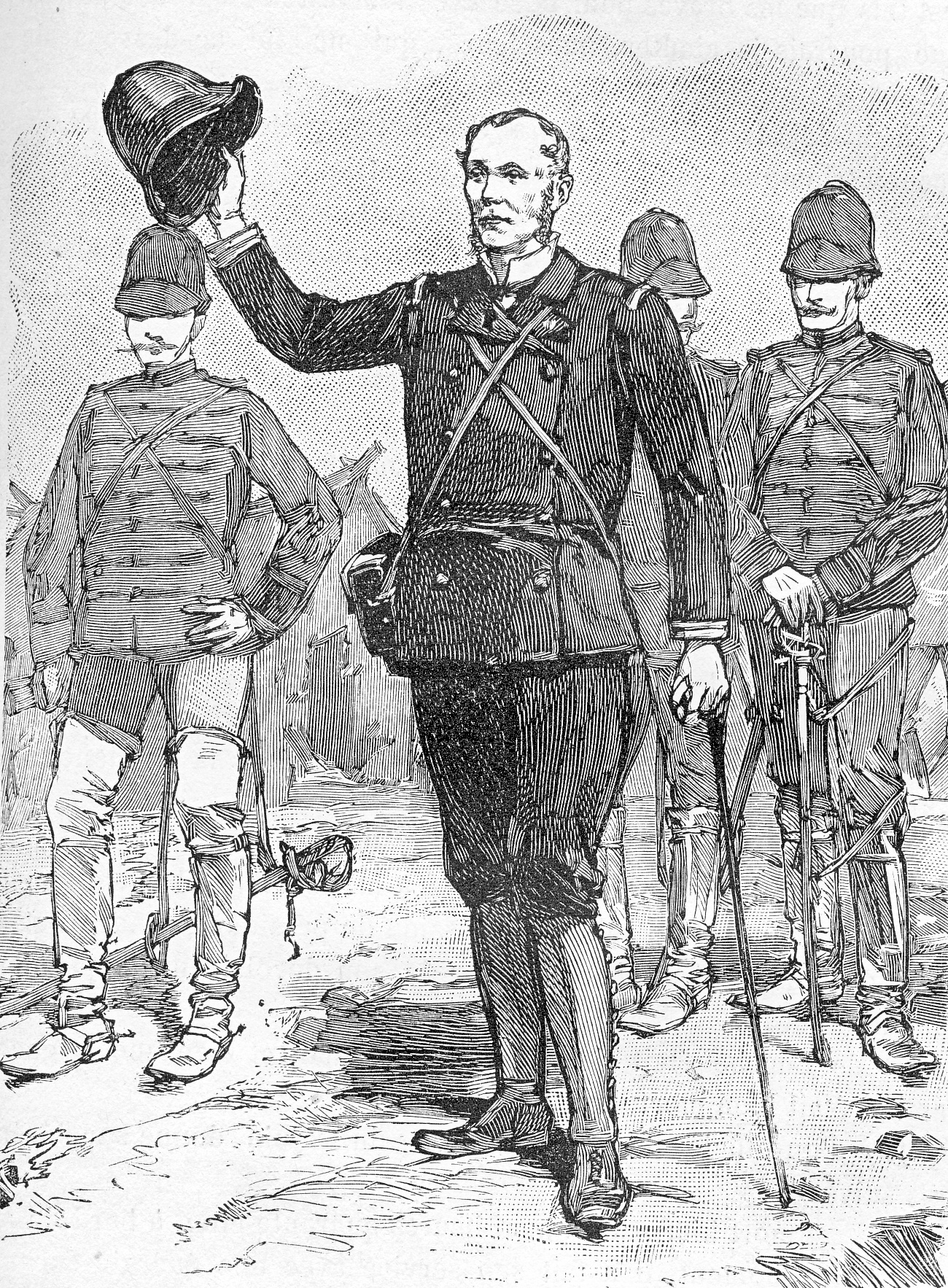
Admiral Courbet acknowledges the acclamation of his troops after the capture of Makung

One quiet afternoon during the spring of 1885 the people of Formosa were startled on hearing what seemed to them the sound of distant thunder. It was not thunder, but the ponderous ironclads of France engaged in demolishing the fortifications over against Fisher Island and Makung. Those fortifications were mounted with good-sized guns of foreign make, and occupied by several thousands of soldiers who had been hastily called from various centres on the mainland. It all availed nothing. Fighting was to be conducted in a very different style from that of other days; and, sure enough, the large floating batteries of the French fleet loomed into sight. According to popular report, no time was lost with any kind of preliminary formalities. The Chinese commenced to fire on the advancing ships, which continued steadily and with ominous silence to press forward in the direction of Makung. When within about rifle-shot range, there burst from them such a tremendous discharge against the large fort outside of the town that many a heart must have been filled with terror and amazement. Indeed, some say that on witnessing the fearful havoc caused by this opening volley from the French guns, both officers and men began to scamper off from the entrenchments; a statement which, however, cannot be altogether correct, since the number of soldiers suffering from frontal wounds, who afterwards found their way to the mission hospital at [Taiwanfu] showed conclusively that not a few of those poor matter-of-fact Chinamen must have made a noble stand against the invaders of their country.

The Pescadores campaign was Courbet's last military victory. Although it was a minor operation compared with the capture of Sơn Tây or the Battle of Fuzhou, in the eyes of his officers it was his most flawless military achievement. Significantly, Courbet directed operations in person, and chose to fight this brief colonial campaign in the traditional style, with ships of the French navy supporting the land operations of marine infantry and artillery. The decision reflected inter-service rivalries. Courbet was cocking a snook at the army ministry, which had long ago wrested the direction of the Tonkin campaign away from the navy ministry. His timing was perfect. While the army ministry was struggling to explain away General François de Négrier's defeat in the battle of Bang Bo (24 March 1885) and the subsequent French retreat from Lạng Sơn, Courbet presented the navy ministry with an elegant, almost bloodless victory in the Pescadores. The Sino-French War ended on a high note for the French navy and the Troupes de Marine.

On 27 July 1885, in the wake of an enquiry into their conduct, the defeated Chinese generals Zhou Shanchu and Zheng Yingjie were demoted and punished for the loss of the Pescadores by being posted to the remote northern Chinese province of Heilongjiang.

== Courbet's flotilla in the Pescadores campaign ==
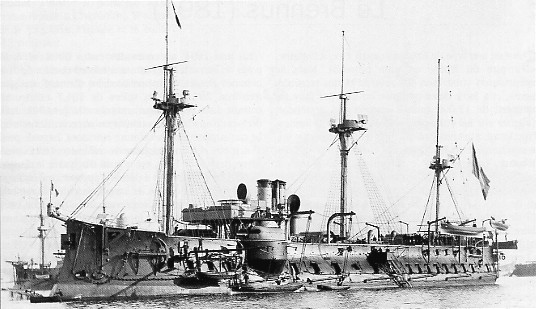
Bayard

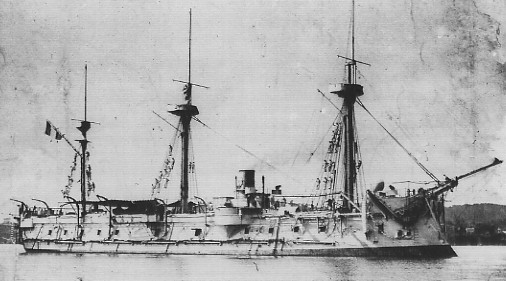
Triomphante

== Significance of the campaign ==
The news of the French capture of the Pescadores initially caused little stir in Paris, as the headlines in early April 1885 were monopolised by the so-called 'Tonkin affair' (the collapse of Jules Ferry's government on 30 March 1885 in the wake of the retreat from Lạng Sơn).

Courbet's victory also came too late to affect the conclusion of preliminaries of peace between France and China on 4 April 1885, but it may have helped to prevent the peace agreement from being sabotaged by hardline elements in China and by the Chinese army commanders fighting the French in northern Vietnam (Tonkin). The Guangxi Army commanders Wang Debang and Feng Zicai, whose forces had recently won a notable victory in the battle of Bang Bo (24 March 1885) and reoccupied Lạng Sơn, received the order to cease fire with consternation. The regional mandarins Bao Chao, Cen Yuying and Peng Yulin, who were directing the war effort against the French in southern China, urged the Qing court to continue the struggle against France. The court replied firmly on 10 April 1885 that it was necessary to make peace immediately because the loss of the Pescadores placed the whole of Taiwan in jeopardy:

The [Guangxi] Army has recovered Lạng Sơn, but the French now occupy P'eng-hu. If Generals Feng and Wang do not cease military operations now, after saving China's military honour, the overall situation in China will once again worsen. It is very dangerous to send an army deep into a strange country, and nothing is certain in warfare. Even if we are successful, Vietnam does not belong to us. But Taiwan is a part of China. If money and reinforcements fail to get through to Taiwan, we will lose it and never get it back. It will then be difficult both to fight on and to make peace, so why should we consider it? Why should we not end the war now, after having won a victory?

This communication silenced the protests from the hardliners, and ensured that the peace with France held.

== The French occupation of the Pescadores ==
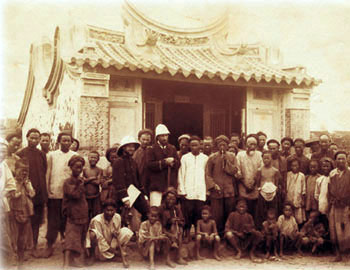
French soldiers and local townsfolk pose for the camera in front of a temple in Makung

Makung became the main base for Courbet's Far East Squadron for the remainder of the war and during a brief period of occupation in the summer of 1885. The Sino-French War ended in April 1885, and under the terms of the peace settlement the French continued to occupy the Pescadores until July, as a surety for the withdrawal of the Chinese armies from Tonkin. Makung Bay was a superb natural harbour, and many of the squadron's officers hoped that France would retain its recent conquest as a counterweight to the British colony of Hong Kong. They even renamed the islands the îles des Pêcheurs ('the fishermen's islands', a French version of the Portuguese name 'Pescadores') in anticipation of their future destiny as a French colony. This was never a realistic prospect. France had fought the war to oust the Chinese from Tonkin, not to make colonial conquests in China itself, and the French punctiliously evacuated the Pescadores on 22 July 1885.

Courbet issued strict instructions that his troops should pay for everything they needed, and the islanders seized the opportunity to make as much money as possible out of the occupying forces during their brief sojourn in the Pescadores. Food markets sprang up around the French cantonments. The French were also interested in buying exotic reminders of their stay in the Far East, and local entrepreneurs, including the abbots of Buddhist monasteries, hastened to satisfy their demand for bronze Buddhas, carved screens and other characteristic souvenirs.

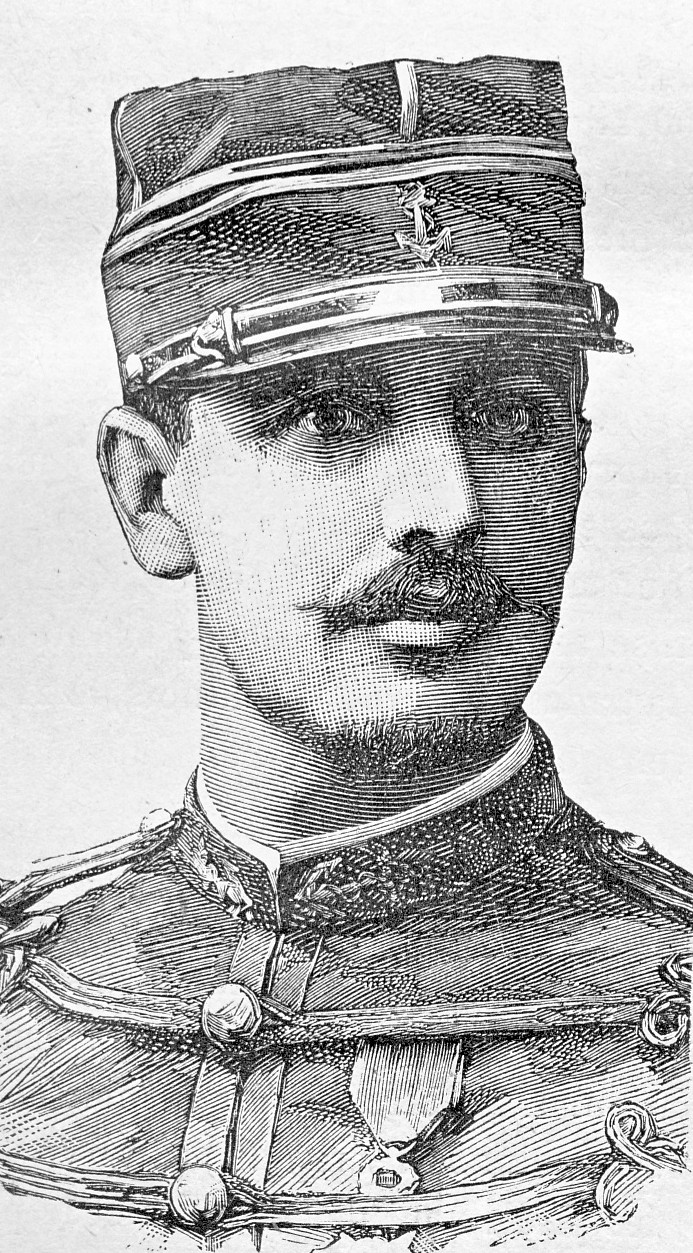
Lieutenant Louis Jehenne. Jehenne died at Makung in June 1885

During their occupation the French surveyed the coastal waters around the islands and considerably improved the rudimentary facilities of Makung harbour. Meanwhile, during the summer of 1885, nearly thirty French warships of the Far East Squadron rode peacefully at anchor off Makung, in the largest concentration of French naval power in the Far East in the history of the French Navy.

Several dozen French soldiers and sailors succumbed to cholera during the French occupation of the Pescadores. Cholera broke out within one or two days of the landing, and by 23 April 15 men had died and a further 20 had been hospitalised. The disease had probably been brought over from Keelung by the marine infantry of Lange's battalion, but the French suspected that it originated in Makung, whose Chinese population lived in cramped and insanitary conditions. Courbet therefore isolated the French cantonments from contact with any possible contagion from Makung. All Chinese houses within a certain distance were demolished to create a cordon sanitaire around the French barracks, several nearby mosquito-ridden streams were filled in, and each barrack hut was disinfected with iron sulphate and phenic acid. These precautions gradually brought the disease under control, and most of the French troops hospitalised in April recovered in May.

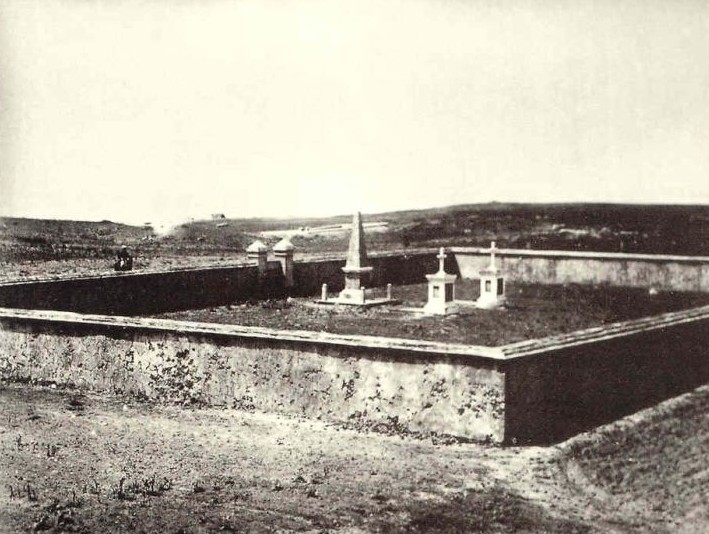
Courbet's monument and the graves of sous-commissaire Dert and Lieutenant Jehenne, photographed in 1895 during a visit by the French cruiser Forfait to Makung

However, the precautions came too late for Admiral Courbet himself, who contracted cholera at the beginning of June and died aboard his flagship Bayard in Makung harbour on the night of 11 June 1885. Courbet's body was taken back to France for a state funeral, but the other French dead were buried in two cemeteries at Makung, one for the marine infantry of Lange's battalion and the other for the sailors of the Far East Squadron.

Two commemorative obelisks erected in the summer of 1885 in these cemeteries can still be seen. One is in Makung itself, the other on the tip of the southern cape that encloses Makung harbour, formerly known as Dutch Point (from the ruins of an old Dutch fort there). Both bear almost identical inscriptions: A la memoire des soldats [marins] français décedés à Makung ('To the memory of the French soldiers [sailors] who died at Makung'). A third obelisk, erected by Admiral Sébastien Lespès as a monument to Courbet's memory, was removed in 1954, but its marble inscription has been preserved: A la memoire de l'amiral Courbet et des braves morts pour la France aux Pescadores en 1885 ('To the memory of Admiral Courbet and the brave men who died for France in the Pescadores in 1885').

The bodies of two marine infantry officers who died of cholera in early June 1885, sous-commissaire Marie-Joseph-Louis Dert and Lieutenant Louis Jehenne, were originally buried in front of Courbet's monument (Courbet had attended their funerals only days before his own death). In 1954, under an agreement reached between the French and ROC governments, their remains were exhumed with full military honours and transferred to the French Cemetery at Keelung aboard the national frigate Commandant Pimodan, where they rest today alongside their old comrades in the Formosa Expeditionary Corps and the Far East Squadron.
