= Coastal defence ship =

Warships built for defending coastlines

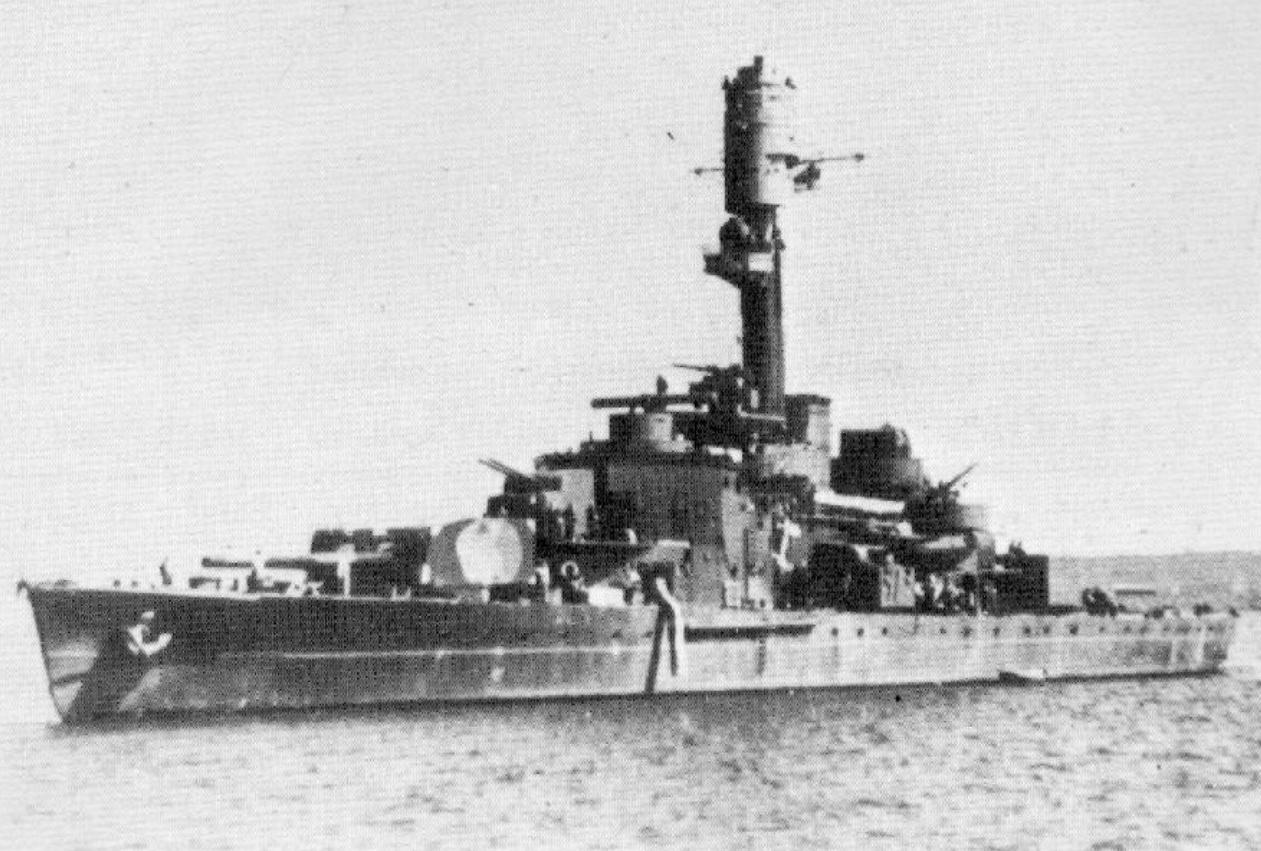
The Finnish coastal defence ship Väinämöinen, one of the last examples of the type.

Coastal defence ships (sometimes called coastal battleships or coast defence ships) were warships built for the purpose of coastal defence, mostly during the period from 1860 to 1920. They were small, often cruiser-sized warships that sacrificed speed and range for armour and armament. They were usually attractive to nations that either could not afford full-sized battleships or could be satisfied by specially designed shallow-draft vessels capable of littoral operations close to their own shores. The Nordic countries and Thailand found them particularly appropriate for their island-dotted coastal waters. Some vessels had limited blue-water capabilities; others operated in rivers.

The coastal defence ships differed from earlier monitors by having a higher freeboard and usually possessing both higher speed and a secondary armament; some examples also mounted casemated guns (monitors' guns were almost always in turrets). They varied in size from around 1,500 tons to 8,000 tons.

Their construction and appearance was often that of miniaturized pre-dreadnought battleships. As such, they carried heavier armour than cruisers or gunboats of equivalent size, were typically equipped with a main armament of two or four heavy and several lighter guns in turrets or casemates, and could steam at a higher speed than most monitors. In service they were mainly used as movable coastal artillery rather than instruments of sea control or fleet engagements like the battleships operated by blue-water navies. Few of these ships saw combat in the First World War, though some did in the Second World War. The last were scrapped in the 1970s. (Note: HSwMS Gustaf V was scrapped in 1970)

Navies with coastal defence ships serving as their main capital ships included those of Denmark, Ecuador, Finland, the Netherlands, Norway, Portugal, Sweden, Thailand, and the British colonies of India and Victoria. Some nations which at one time or another built, bought, or otherwise acquired their own front-line capital ships, such as Argentina, Austria-Hungary, Brazil, China, Germany, Russia, and Spain, also deployed this type of warship, with Russia using three at the Battle of Tsushima in 1905.

Apart from specially built coastal defence ships, some navies used various obsolescent ships in this role. The Royal Navy deployed four Majestic-class battleships as guardships in the Humber at the start of the First World War. Similarly, the U.S. Navy redesignated the Indiana and Iowa classes as "Coast Defense Battleships" in 1919. Such ships tended to be near the end of their service lives and while generally considered no longer fit for front-line service, they were still powerful enough for defensive duties in reserve situations.

== Categorization ==
This type of vessel has always been categorized differently by different countries, due to treaties, differences in judgments related to design or intended roles, and also national pride. In the United Kingdom the Scandinavian ships were known as "coast defence ships". The Germans called these ships Küstenpanzerschiff ("coastal armoured ship"). The Danes referred to their ships as Kystforsvarsskib ("coast defence ship") and Panserskib ("armoured ship"). In Norway they were referred to as panserskip ("armoured ship"). The Dutch called their ships Kruiser ("cruiser"), Pantserschip ("armoured ship") or Slagschip ("battleship"). The Swedish term for these ships was initially 1:a klass Pansarbåt ("1st class armoured boat") and later Pansarskepp ("armoured ship"). Note however, that the German Panzerschiffe of the Deutschland class were not designed as coastal defence ships but as high seas raiders.

As an example of the profusion of terms and classifications which often contradicted each other, the 1938 edition of Jane's Fighting Ships lists the Swedish Pansarskepp of the Sverige class as battleships.

== Swedish Pansarskepp ==
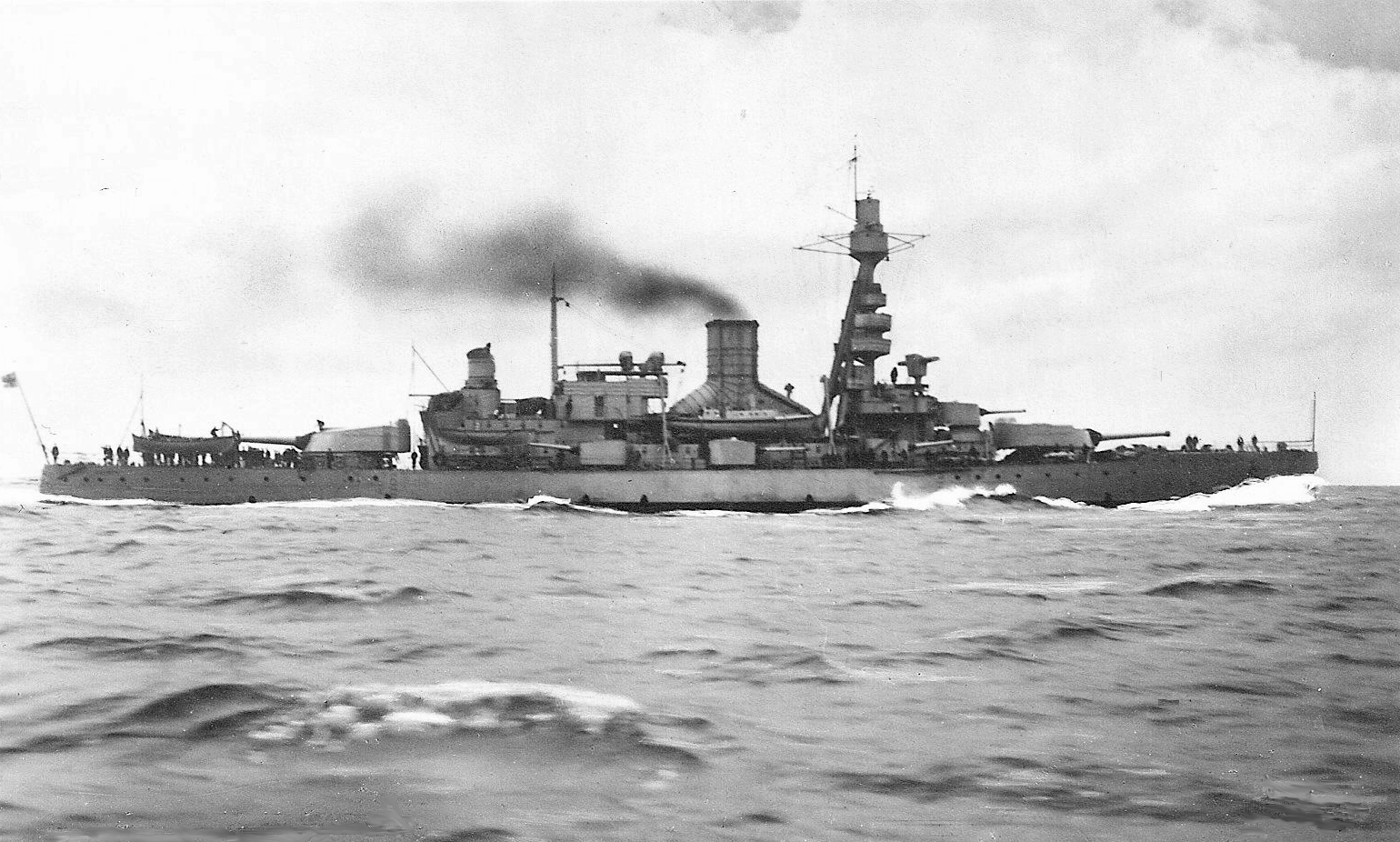
Gustaf V in 1930 after refit and merged funnels.

The Swedish Pansarskepp were an outgrowth of the earlier Swedish adoption of the monitor and were used for similar duties.

=== Technical details ===
The Pansarskepp or Pansarbåt, with the notable exception of the Sverige class, were relatively small vessels with limited speed, shallow draft, and very heavy guns relative to the displacement. They were designed for close in-shore work in the littoral zone of Scandinavia, and other countries with shallow coastal waters. The aim was to outgun any ocean-going warship of the same draft by a significant margin, making it a very dangerous opponent for a cruiser, and deadly to anything smaller. The limitations in speed and seaworthiness were a trade-off for the heavy armament carried. Vessels similar to the Swedish Pansarskepp were also built and operated by Denmark, Norway, and Finland, all of which had similar naval requirements.

=== Effectiveness ===
The Sverige-class ships differed in several ways from the classical coastal defence ship, having heavier armament as well as better speed and armour (while still being small enough to operate and hide in the archipelagos and shallow waters off Sweden). The main difference was to be noted in their tactical doctrine and operations. Unlike other coastal defence ships the Sverige class formed the core of a traditional open-sea battle group (Coastal Fleet), operating with cruisers, destroyers, torpedo boats, and air reconnaissance in conformance with traditional battleship tactics of the time.

This "mini-battle group" had no intention of challenging the great power navies in blue-water battles, but rather were to operate as a defensive shield to aggression challenging Swedish interests and territory. Based on the doctrine that one needs a battle group to challenge other battle groups, this force intended to form a problematic obstacle in the confined and shallow Baltic and Kattegat theatre, where traditional large warships would be limited to very predictable moving patterns exposing them to submarines, fast torpedo craft, and minefields. It has been suggested that the Sverige-class ships were one reason why Germany did not invade Sweden during World War II. Such speculation appeared in Warship Magazine Annual 1992 in the article "The Sverige Class Coastal Defence Ships," by Daniel G. Harris. This could be said to have been partly confirmed in the post war publication of German tactical orders, and of scenarios regarding attacking Sweden. The problems of maintaining an army in Sweden without sea superiority were emphasized, and the lack of available suitable units to face the Swedish navy was pointed out ("Stations for battle", Insulander/Olsson, 2001). Summarizing the question of effectiveness for the Sverige class, it is likely that despite a good armament they would have been too small, slow, and cramped (from both a habitability and essential ship's stores standpoint), along with having insufficient range, to perform adequately against any traditional battlecruiser or battleship in a blue-water scenario; however, if correctly used in their home waters and in a defensive situation, they would probably have presented a major challenge for any aggressor.

== Dutch Pantserschepen ==
The Dutch used their armoured ships mainly to defend their interests overseas, in particular their colonial possessions in the West Indies (the islands of the Netherlands Antilles) and the East Indies (primarily, modern Indonesia). For this reason the ships had to be capable of long-range cruising, providing artillery support during amphibious operations, and carrying the troops and equipment needed in these operations. At the same time, these ships had to be armed and armoured well enough to face contemporary armoured cruisers of the Imperial Japanese Navy (the Netherlands' most likely enemy in the Pacific), and as such they were expected to act as mini-battleships rather than strictly as coastal defence vessels.

The last Dutch pantserschip, HNLMS De Zeven Provinciën, was built in 1909 as a stop-gap measure while the Dutch Admiralty and government contemplated an ambitious fleet plan comprising a number of dreadnought battleships. This ambition was never realized due to the outbreak of the First World War. The Second World War put an end to a similar project to obtain fast capital ships in the late 1930s with German assistance.

Prior to the Second World War, the Dutch had relegated all the surviving pantserschepen to secondary duties. The Axis powers, who seized some of the ships following the conquest of the Netherlands, converted several of those ships to serve as floating anti-aircraft batteries and subsequently utilized some as block ships.

== Operators ==
The navies of the following countries have operated coastal defence ships at some point in time.

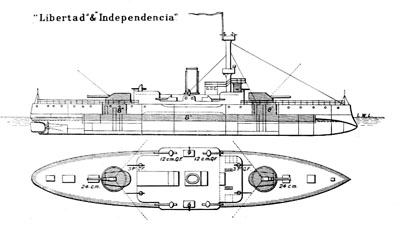
Side and top views of ARA Independencia in Brassey's 1899 edition

=== Argentina ===
- El Plata class (1874)
  - El Plata
  - Los Andes
- Libertad class (1890)
  - Independencia
  - Libertad

=== Austria-Hungary ===
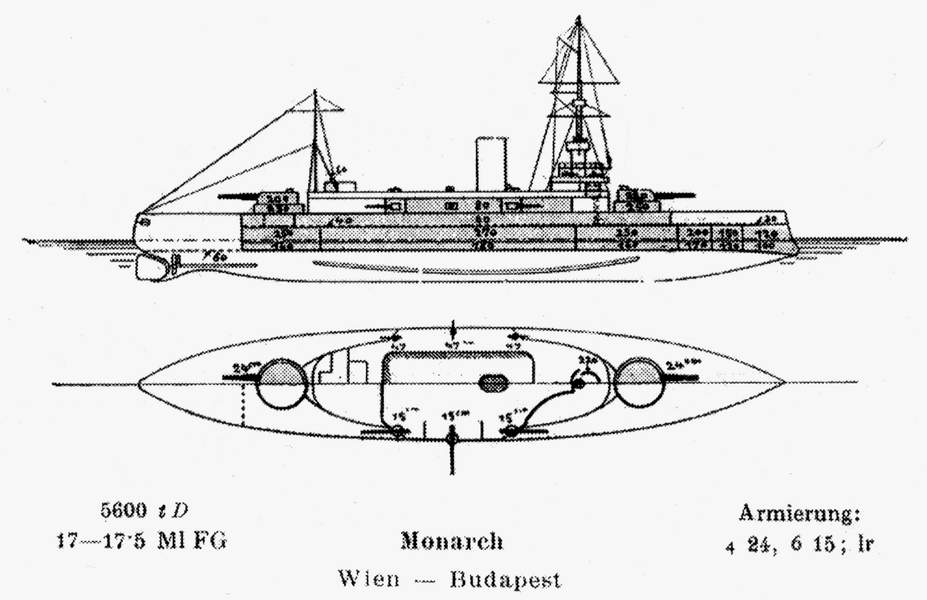
Right elevation and plan of the Monarch class; the shaded area is armoured

- Monarch class (1895)
  - SMS Monarch
  - SMS Wien
  - SMS Budapest

=== Brazil ===
- Barroso
- Brasil
- Lima Barros
- Rio de Janeiro
- Bahia
- Silvado
- Mariz e Barros class (1866)
  - Mariz e Barros
  - Herval
- Cabral class (1866)
  - Cabral
  - Colombo
- Sete de Setembro (1874)
- Javari-class (1874)
  - Javary
  - Solimões
- Marshal Deodoro class (1898)
  - Deodoro - Sold to Mexico in 1924 as Anáhuac
  - Floriano

=== China ===
- Pingyuan (1888)

=== Denmark ===
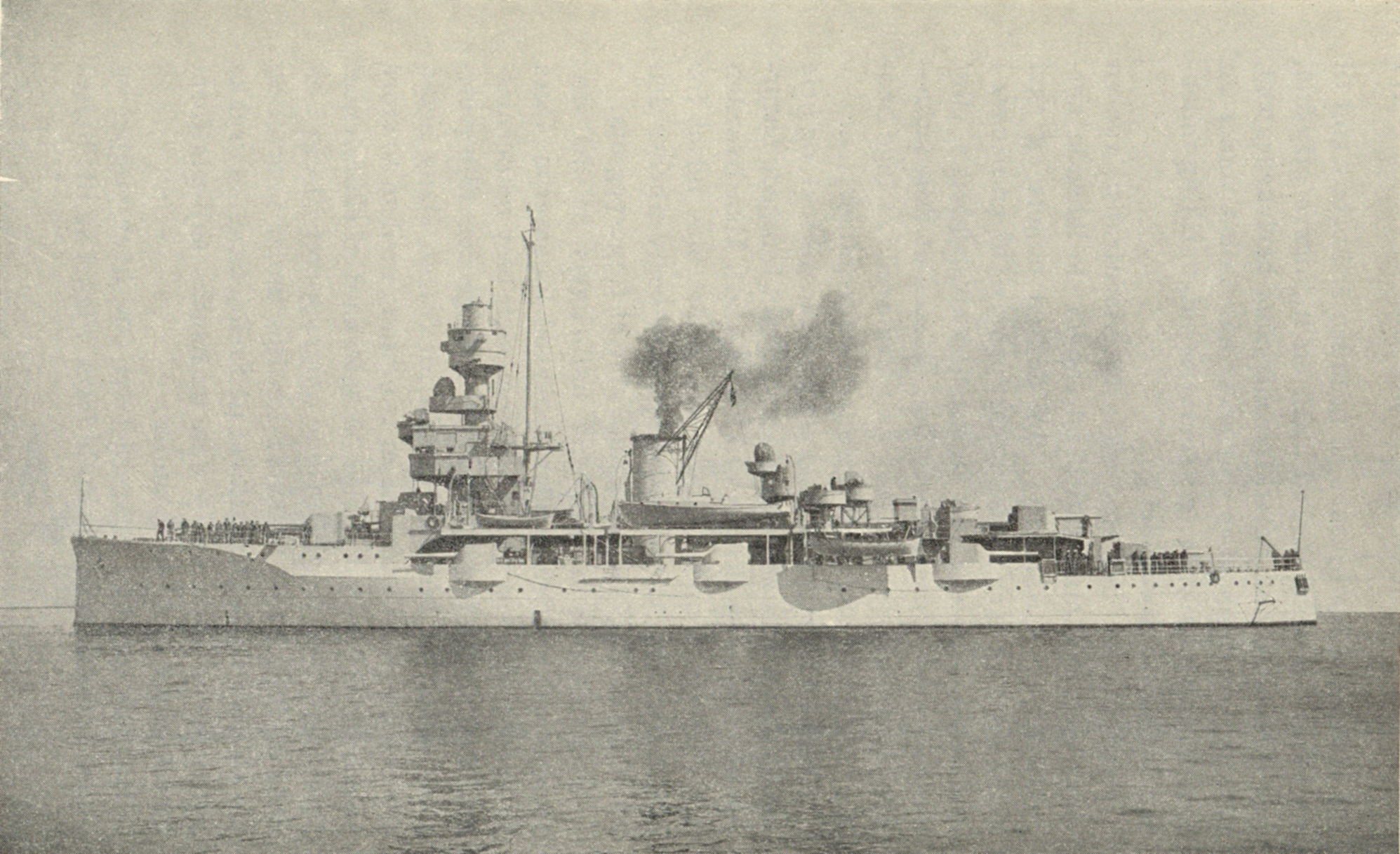
HDMS Niels Juel in 1939

- Helgoland
- Iver Hvitfeldt
- Skjold
- Herluf Trolle class (1899)
  - Herluf Trolle
  - Olfert Fischer
  - Peder Skram
- Niels Juel

=== Finland ===
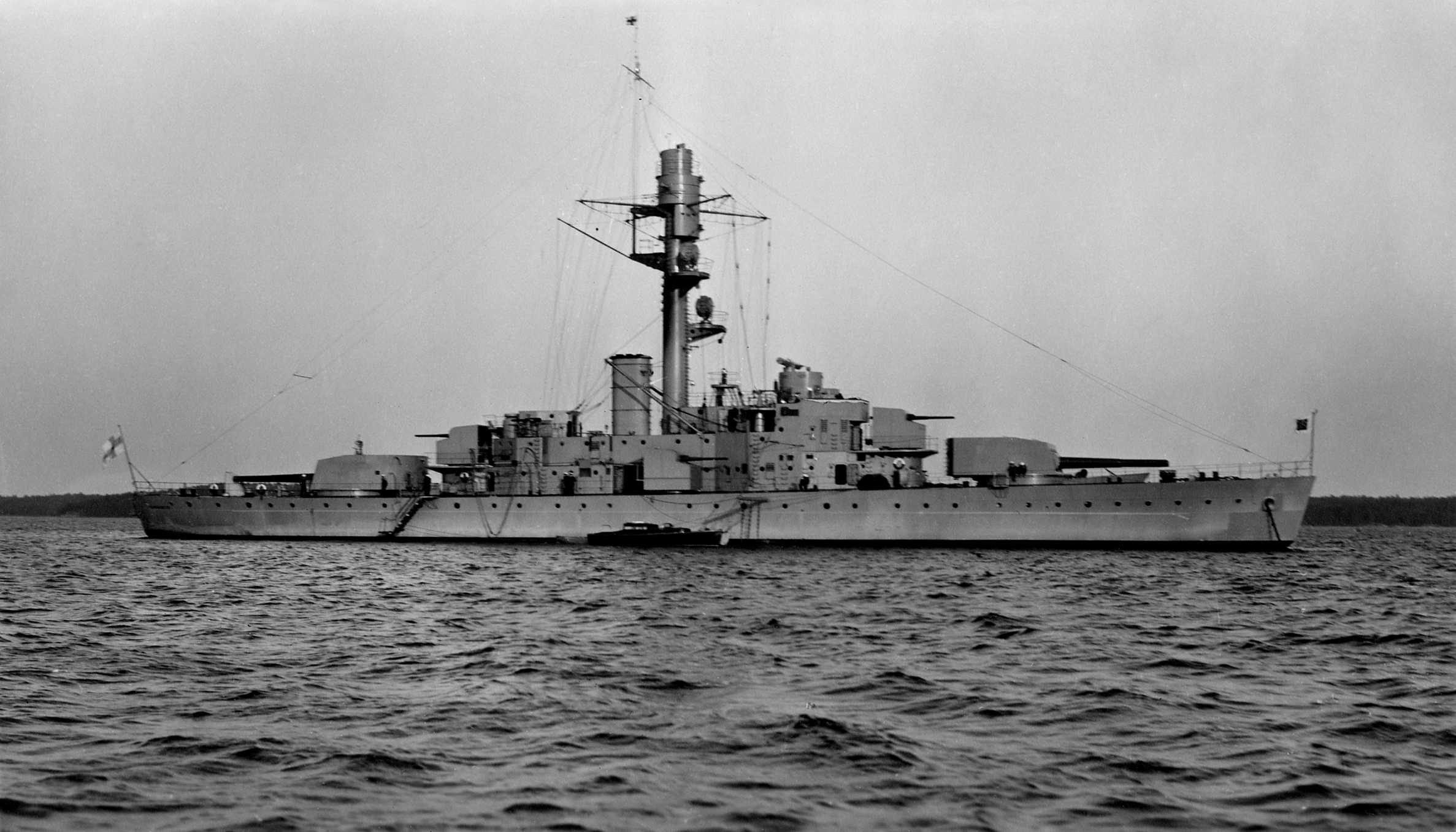
Väinämöinen in 1938

- Väinämöinen-class Panssarilaiva ships (1931)
  - Ilmarinen
  - Väinämöinen - transferred to Soviet Union as a reparations ship in 1947, served in Soviet Navy until 1966.

=== France ===
- Taureau
- Onondaga
- Cerbère
  - Bélier
  - Bouledogue
  - Cerbère
  - Tigre
- Tonnerre
  - Tonnerre
  - Fulminant
- Tempête
  - Tempête
  - Vengeur
- Tonnant
- Furieux
- Jemmapes class 6,476 tons.
  - Jemmapes (1892) – hulked 1911.
  - Valmy (1892) – stricken 1911.
- Bouvines class 6,681 tons.
  - Amiral Tréhouart (1893) – stricken 1922.
  - Bouvines (1892) – stricken 1920.
- Henri IV

=== Germany ===
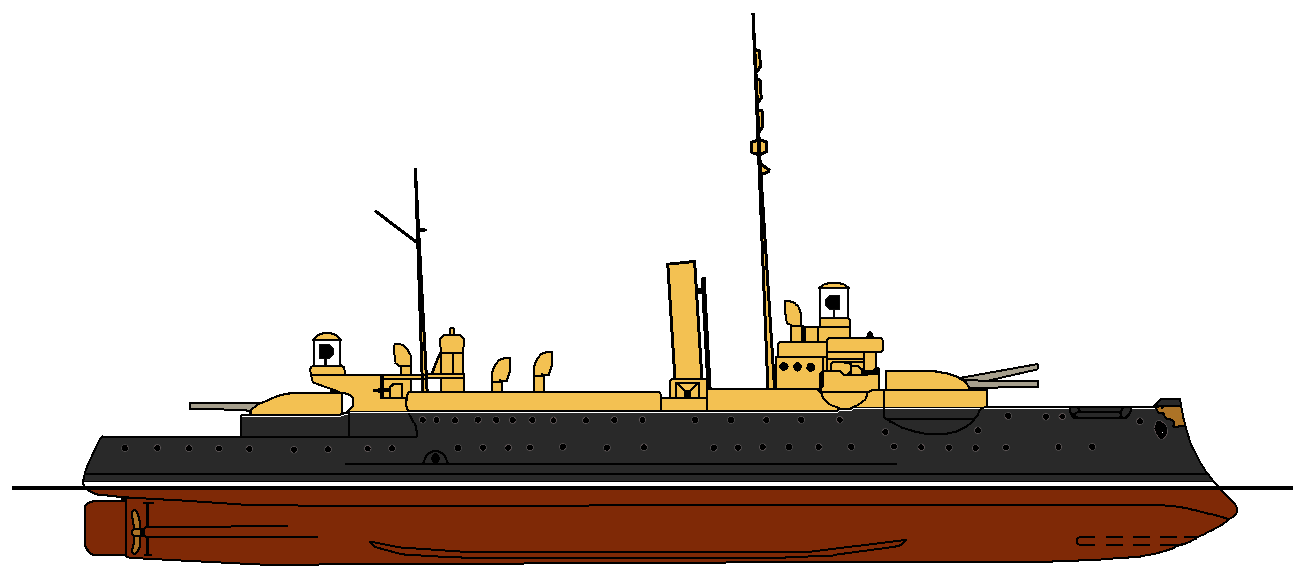
Line-drawing of Siegfried as originally configured

- Siegfried class (1890)
  - Siegfried
  - Beowulf
  - Frithjof
  - Hagen
  - Heimdall
  - Hildebrand
- Odin class (1896)
  - Odin
  - Ägir

=== India ===
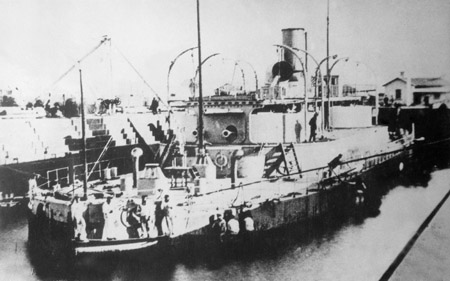
HMVS Cerberus at Williamstown in 1871

- Cerberus class (1870)
  - Magdala
  - Abyssinia (half-sister to Cerberus & Magdala)

=== British Colony of Victoria ===
- Cerberus class
  - HMVS Cerberus

=== Mexico ===
- Deodoro class (1898)
  - ARM Anáhuac - acquired from Brazil in 1924

=== The Netherlands ===
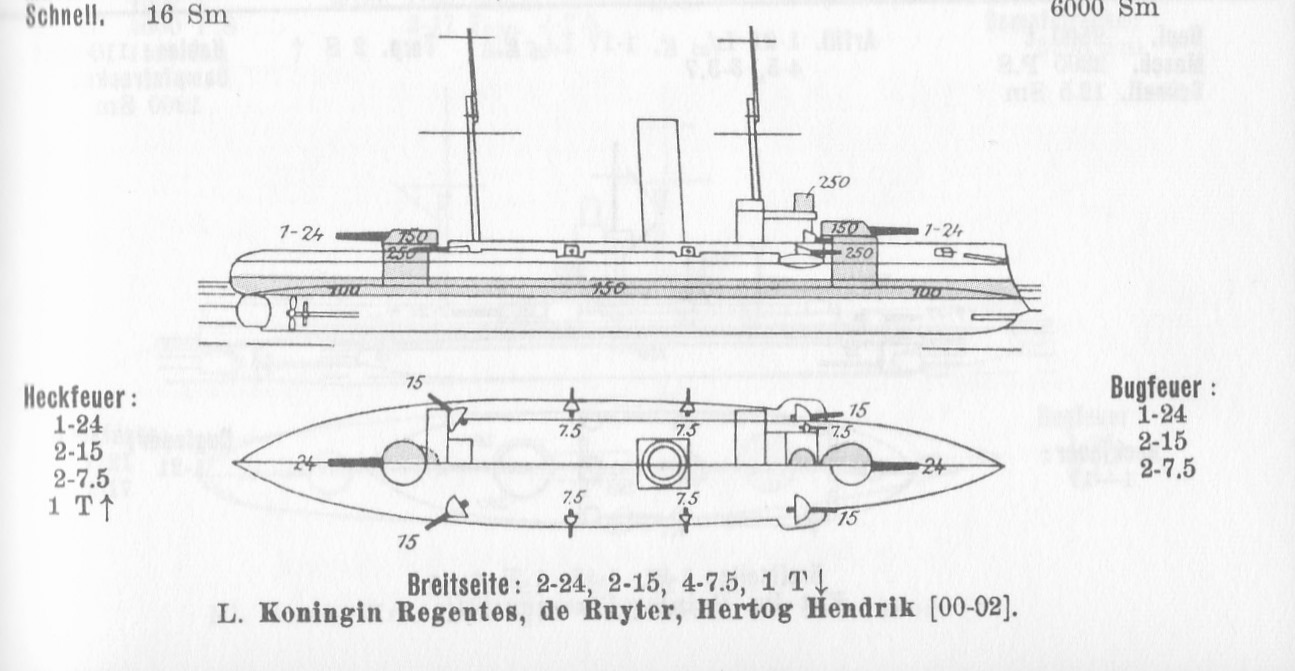
Plan and side view of the Koningin Regentes class

- Evertsen class (1894)
  - HNLMS Evertsen
  - HNLMS Piet Hein
  - HNLMS Kortenaer
- Koningin Regentes class (1900)
  - HNLMS Koningin Regentes
  - HNLMS De Ruyter
  - HNLMS Hertog Hendrik
- HNLMS Marten Harpertzoon Tromp
- HNLMS Jacob Van Heemskerck
- HNLMS De Zeven Provinciën

=== Norway ===
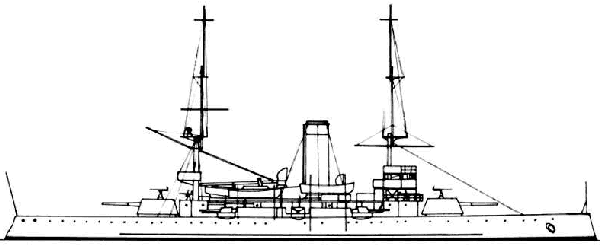
Norwegian Tordenskjold class

- Tordenskjold class (1897)
  - HNoMS Tordenskjold
  - HNoMS Harald Haarfagre
- Eidsvold class (1899)
  - HNoMS Eidsvold
  - HNoMS Norge
- Bjørgvin class (1914) – Both ships were requisitioned by the Royal Navy during World War I while under construction, completed and served as the monitors HMS Glatton and HMS Gorgon
  - HNoMS Bjørgvin
  - HNoMS Nidaros

=== Russia ===
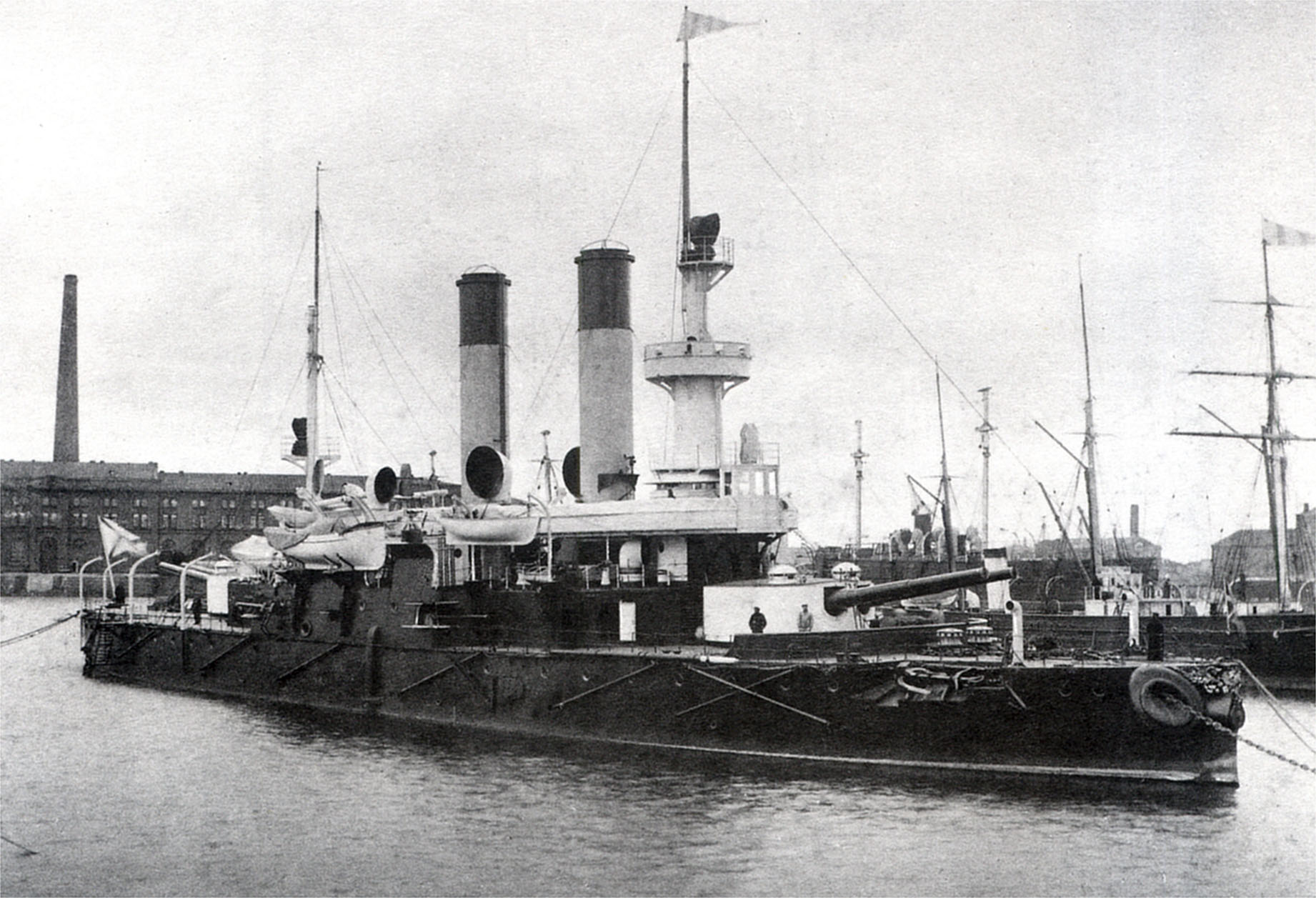
Admiral Ushakov in 1897

- Uragan class (1865)
- Novgorod class (1874) – later reclassified as "Coastal Defence Armour-Clad Ships"
  - Novgorod
  - Vitse-admiral Popov
- Admiral Ushakov class (1895)
  - Admiral Ushakov
  - Admiral Seniavin
  - General Admiral Graf Apraksin - Captured by Japan in 1905, served in Imperial Japanese Navy until 1922.

=== Sweden ===
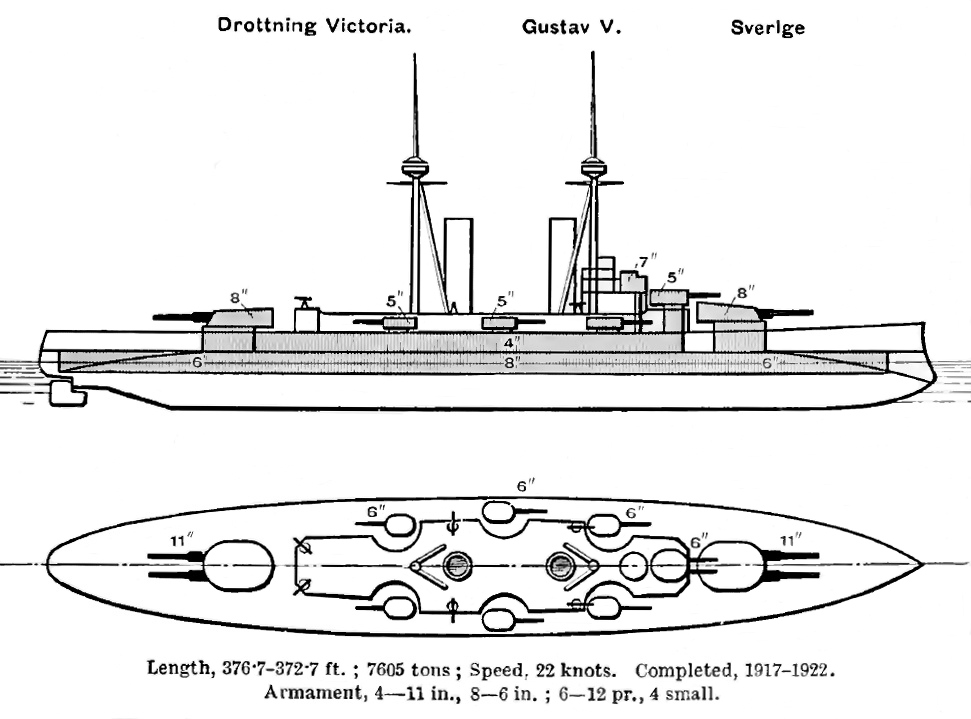
Right elevation and deck plan of Sverige as depicted in Brassey's Naval Annual, 1923

- Svea class (1886)
  - Svea
  - Göta
  - Thule
- Oden class (1896)
  - Oden
  - Thor
  - Niord
- Dristigheten (1900)
- Äran class (1902)
  - Äran
  - Wasa
  - Tapperheten
  - Manligheten
- Oscar II (1905)
- Sverige class (1917)
  - Sverige
  - Gustav V
  - Drottning Victoria

=== Thailand ===
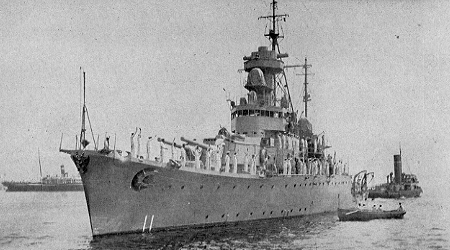
Thonburi in 1938

- Rattanakosindra class
  - Ratanakosin
  - Sukhothai
- Thonburi class (1938)
  - HTMS Sri Ayudhya
  - HTMS Thonburi

== See also ==
- List of coastal defence ships of the Second World War
