= French ironclad Cerbère =

History

France
- Name: Cerbère
- Namesake: Cerberus
- Ordered: 15 January 1865
- Builder: Arsenal de Brest
- Laid down: 14 September 1865
- Launched: 23 April 1868
- Completed: July 1870
- Stricken: 12 November 1886
- Fate: Scrapped, 1887

General characteristics (as built)
- Class & type: Bélier-class ironclad ram
- Displacement: 3,589 t (3,532 long tons)
- Length: 72 m (236 ft 3 in) (oa)
- Beam: 16.14 m (52 ft 11 in)
- Draft: 5.83 m (19 ft 2 in)
- Installed power: 6 boilers; 2,120 ihp (1,580 kW)
- Propulsion: 2 × screws; 2 × return connecting rod engines
- Speed: 12 kn (22 km/h; 14 mph)
- Range: 1,800 nmi (3,300 km; 2,100 mi) at 10 knots (19 km/h; 12 mph)
- Complement: 147
- Armament: 2 × 240 mm (9.4 in) guns
- Armor: Waterline belt: 220 mm (8.7 in); Gun turret: 180 mm (7.1 in); Deck: 15 mm (0.6 in)

Cerbère was the lead ship of her class of four ironclad rams built for the French Navy during the 1870s. Completed in 1870, she spent most of her career in reserve although the ship was briefly commissioned during the Franco-Prussian War of 1870–1871. Cerbère was scrapped in 1887.

== Design and development ==
The Bélier class constituted a reversal of the defensive philosophy that drove the design of the preceding ironclad ram, Taureau, with their emphasis on an offensive role using their guns instead of a ram. The ships had an overall length of 72 m (236 ft 3 in), a beam of 16.14 m (52 ft 11 in) and a draft of 5.83 m (19.1 ft). They displaced 3,589 metric tons (3,532 long tons). They were powered by a pair of two-cylinder direct-acting steam engines that used steam provided by six boilers to drive each propeller shaft. The engines were rated at a total of 2,120 indicated horsepower (1,580 kW) that was intended to give the ships a speed of 12 knots (22 km/h; 14 mph). The ships carried enough coal to give them a range of 1,800 nautical miles (3,300 km; 2,100 mi) at a speed of 10 knots (19 km/h; 12 mph). The ship's complement numbered 147 sailors of all ranks.

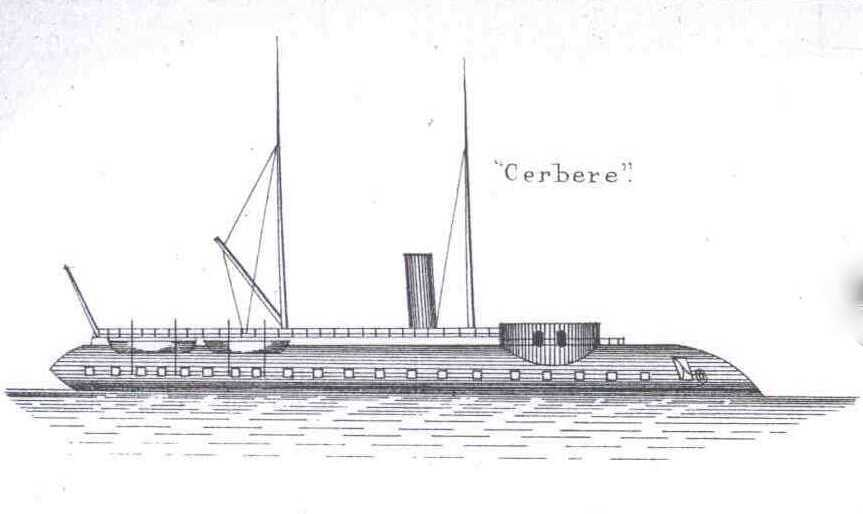
Cerbère class

Cerbére was armed with a main battery of two 240 mm (9.4 in) Mle 1864 rifled breech-loading guns in a turret in the bow. The turret sat above a barbette that housed the turret machinery; both had armor 180 mm (7.1 in) thick. The ships were protected by a full-length waterline belt of wrought iron that was 220 mm (8.7 in) thick. The deck armor was 15 mm (0.6 in) thick in Cerbère.

== Construction and career ==
The ship was completed in July 1870 and cruised to Cherbourg and Le Havre in July and August before returning to Brest. The ship was placed in full commission on 12 December until she was reduced to reserve at Cherbourg on 16 April 1871. Cerbère was struck from the navy list on 12 November 1886 and was broken up there the following year.

== Bibliography ==
- Campbell, N. J. M. (1979). "France". In Chesneau, Roger & Kolesnik, Eugene M. (eds.). Conway's All the World's Fighting Ships 1860–1905. Greenwich, UK: Conway Maritime Press. pp. 282–333. ISBN 978-0-85177-133-5.
- de Balincourt, Captain & Vincent-Bréchignac, Captain (1973). "French Floating Batteries". F.P.D.S. Newsletter. I (2): 13–20. OCLC 41554533.
- Gille, Eric (1999). Cent ans de cuirassés français [A Century of French Battleships] (in French). Nantes: Marines. ISBN 2-909-675-50-5.
- Roberts, Stephen S. (2021). French Warships in the Age of Steam 1859–1914: Design, Construction, Careers and Fates. Barnsley, UK: Seaforth Publishing. ISBN 978-1-5267-4533-0.
- Roche, Jean-Michel (2005). Dictionnaire des bâtiments de la flotte de guerre française de Colbert à nos jours [Dictionary of French Warships from Colbert to Today] (in French). Vol. Tome I: 1671–1870. Toulon: Roche. ISBN 978-2-9525917-0-6. OCLC 165892922.
