= Taureau =

Taureau may refer to:

- Taureau, an ironclad ram of the French Navy.
- Taureau (film), a Canadian drama film directed by Clément Perron
- Taureau Reservoir
