= Canon de 24 C modèle 1870 =

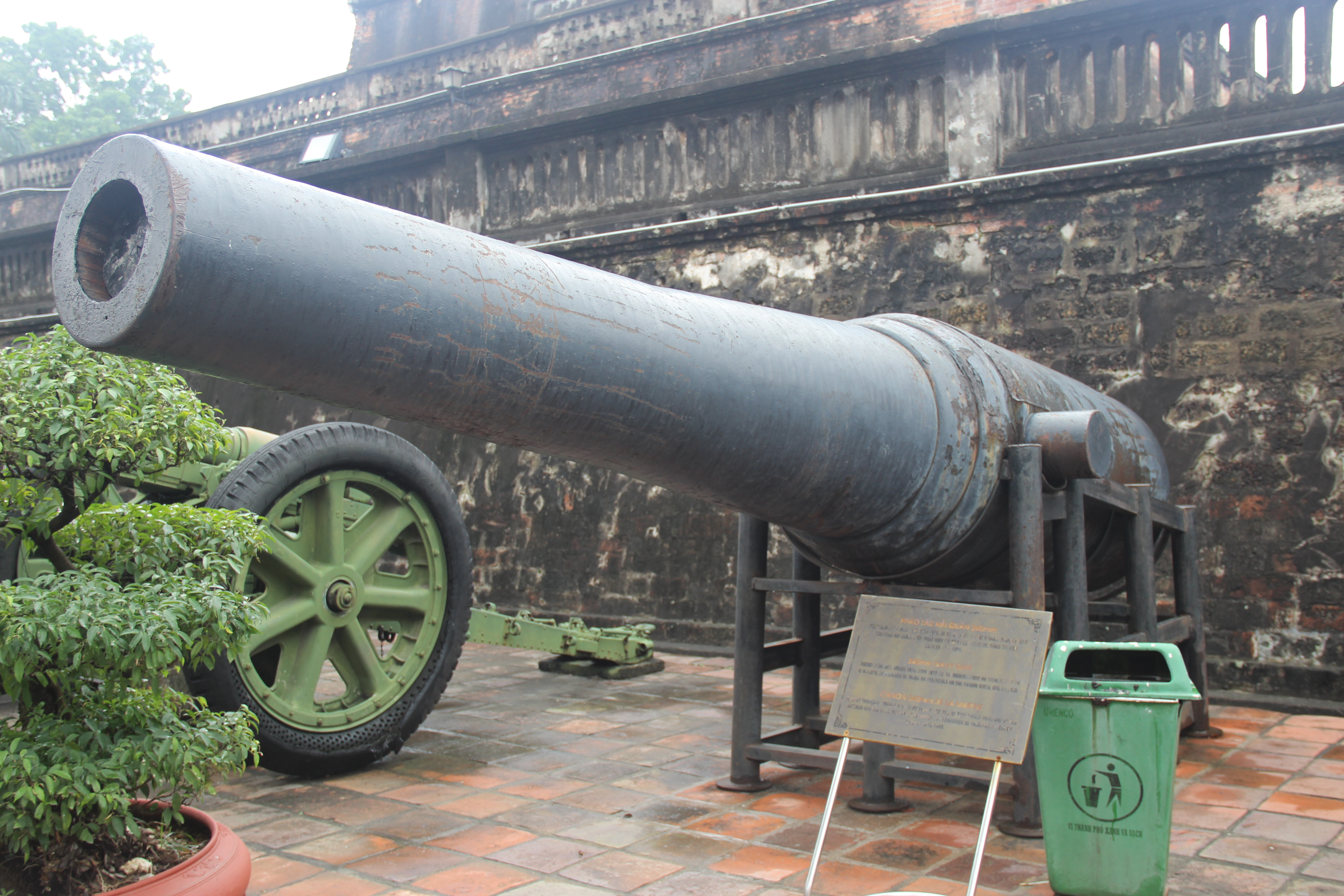
- A Canon de 24 C modèle 1870 in Vietnam
- Type: Naval artillery
- Place of origin: France

Service history
- In service: 1870 – c. 1918
- Used by: France
- Wars: World War I

Production history
- Designed: 1870?
- Manufacturer: Ruelle Foundry
- Produced: 1870?
- Variants: Railway gun

Specifications
- Mass: 15,660 kg
- Length: 4.940 m (16.21 ft) L/21
- Shell: Separate-loading, bagged charge and projectiles
- Caliber: 240 mm (9.4 in)
- Breech: screw
- Elevation: -5° to +30°
- Rate of fire: 1 round every two minutes
- Muzzle velocity: 474 m/s (1,560 ft/s) regular; 500 m/s (1,600 ft/s) 1870 M; 440 m/s (1,400 ft/s) armor-piercing; 495 m/s (1,620 ft/s) 1870 M
- Effective firing range: 10 km (6.2 mi) 10.8 km (6.7 mi) 1870 M

The Canon de 24 C modèle 1870 was a rifled breech loader built-up gun used on board the French Navy and as coastal artillery. All units were later modified to use an increased charge, the so-called Canon de 24 C modèle 1870 M.

== Development ==
=== The 1864 system ===
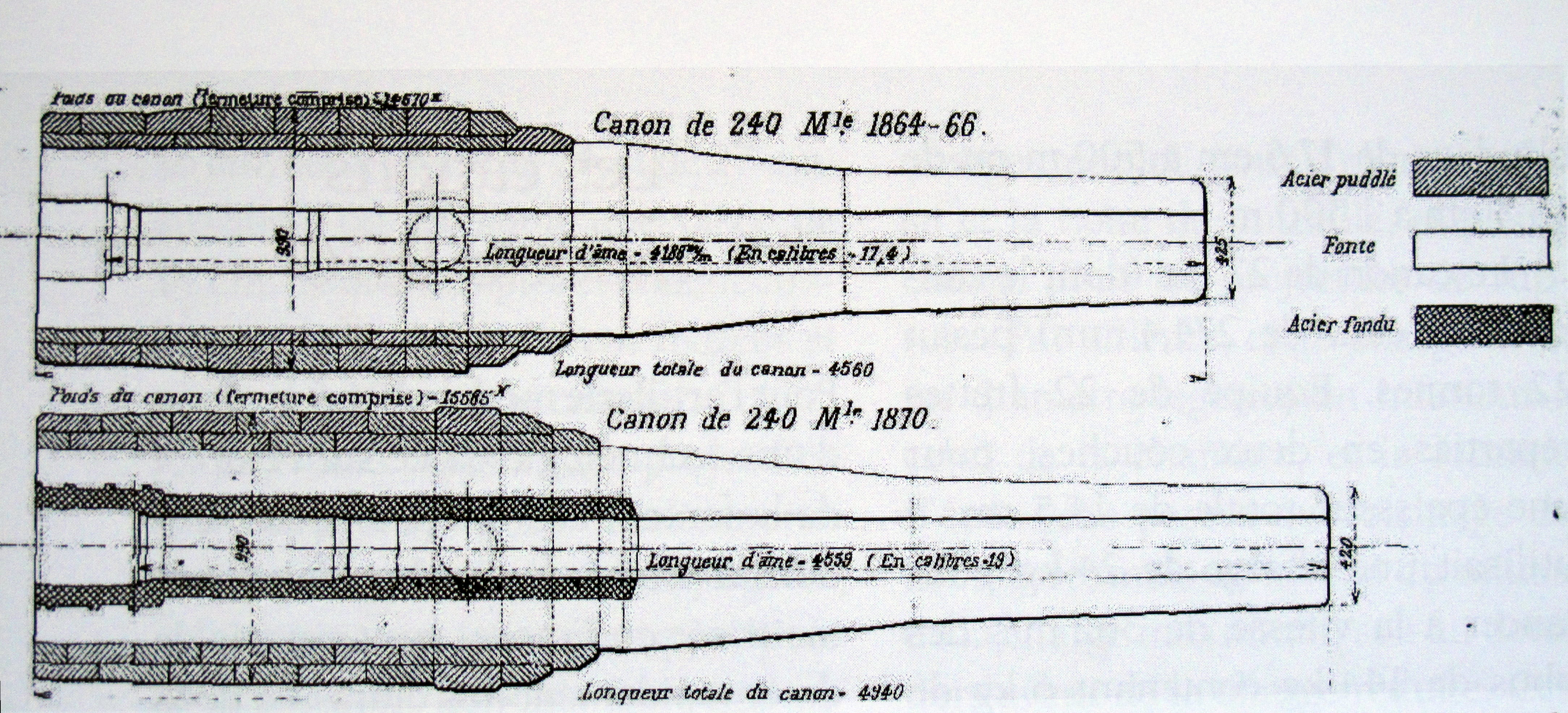
M 1864-66 and M 1870

While France was quick to switch from muzzle loading to breech loading guns, it held on to using cast iron gun barrels for quite some time. It did so for reasons of cost, speed and facility of construction. In 1864 a new series of guns was designed. These guns were put into service in 1867.

These system 1864-1868 cast iron guns with steel hoops fired cylindrical projectiles that weighed thrice the weight of the round bullet of the same diameter and gave these an initial velocity of 334–345 m/s. The Canon de 24 C modèle 1864 can be considered as the direct predecessor of the Canon de 24 C modèle 1870.

=== The 1870 system ===
In early 1870, French authorities decided to react to the ever increasing armor protection of ships by creating a new Modèle 1870 system. The guns of these system were also hooped. The essential innovation was a short steel inner tube which increased longitudinal strength. As regards rifling, these guns used many shallow grooves instead of a handful of deep grooves. It was estimated that these guns could endure peak pressures that were about 50% higher than those that the modèle 1864 could stand.

The obturator of these guns was formed by a ring of red copper. The ignition took place via the breech block, so that the ignition of the charge started in the center of the bottom part of the charge. This led to more regular velocities and less strain on the gun. The model 1870 guns also used less offensive gunpowder and longer projectiles with copper driving bands and a bourrelet.

== Characteristics ==
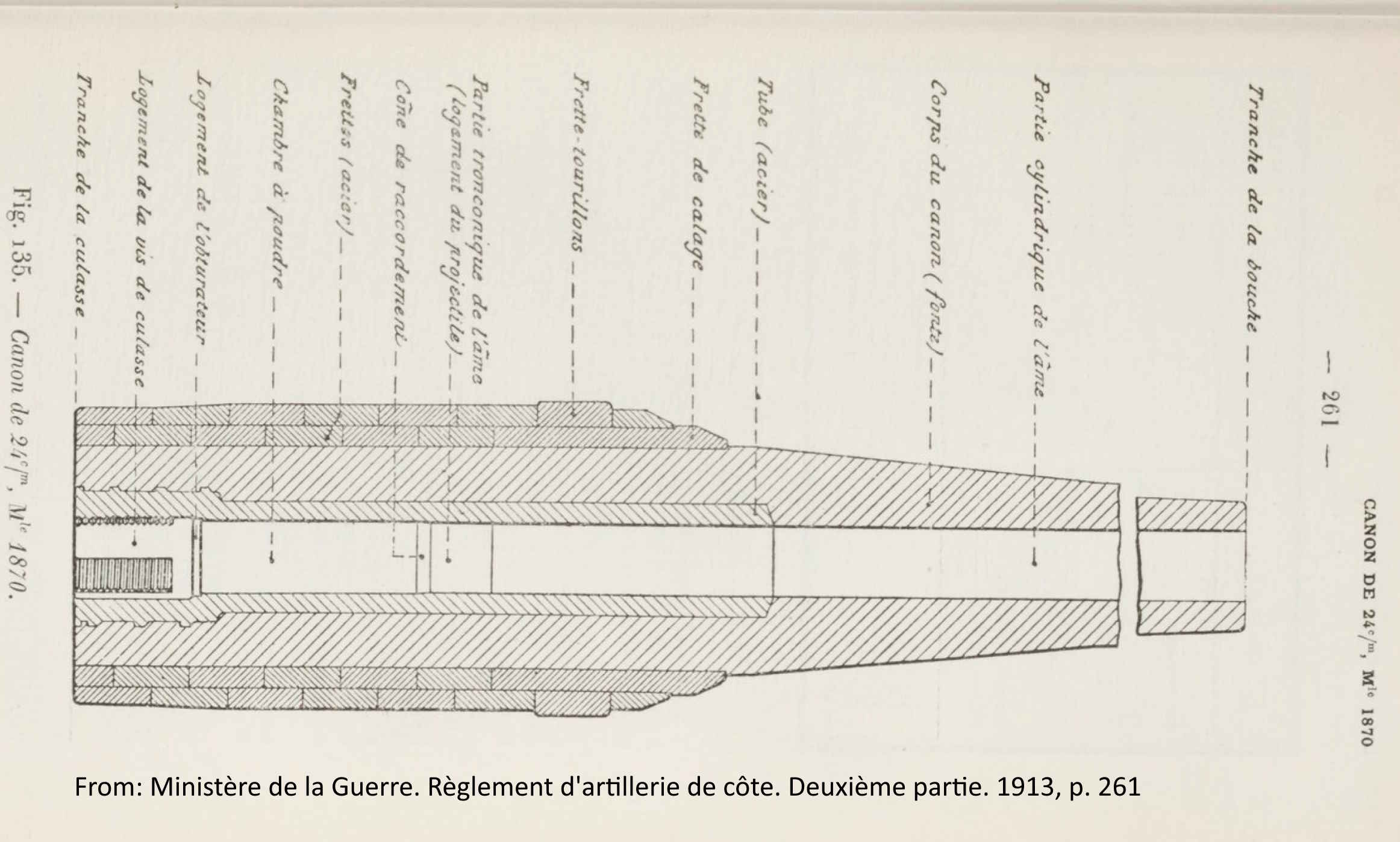
The barrel

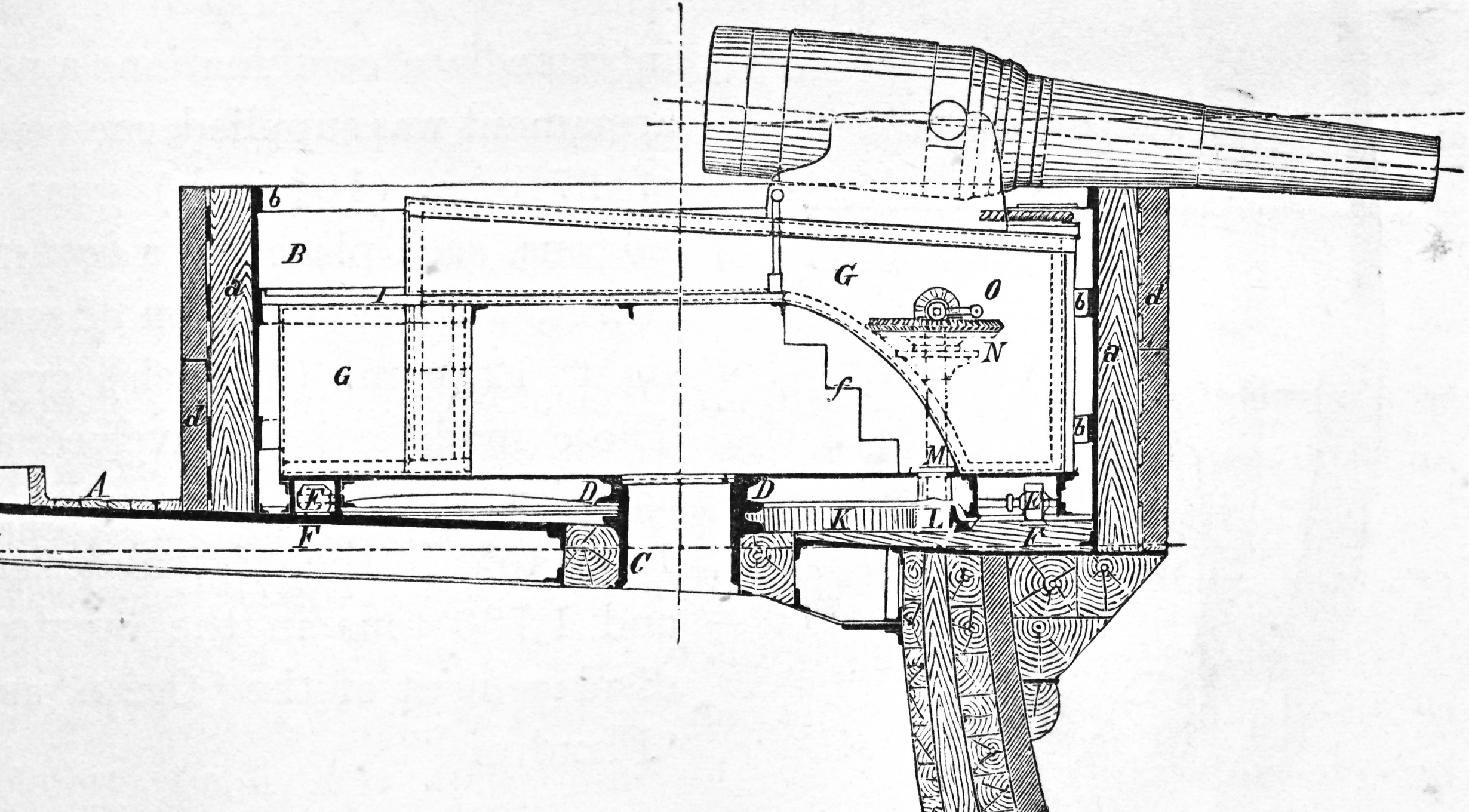
A 24 C modèle 1870 en barbette on the ironclad Océan

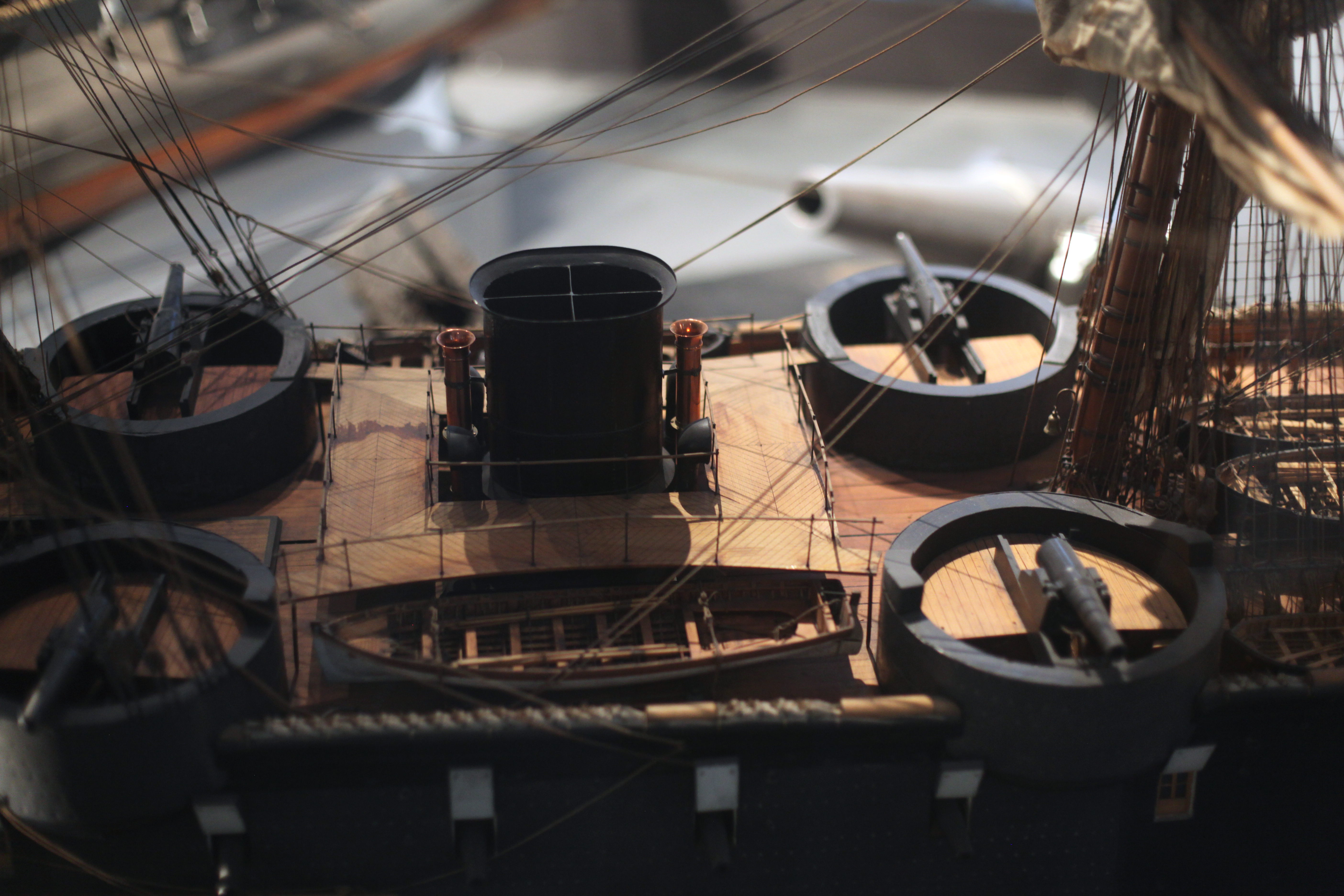
Mounted en barbette on the upper deck of Océan

The core of the barrel of the Canon de 24 C modèle 1870 was made of cast iron. Towards the breech, there were two layers of steel rings or hoops on the outside over a length of 2,125 mm. On the inside, a short steel tube ran from the breech till somewhat before the trunnions. The barrel was 4,940 mm long and weighed 15,660 kg.

The length of bore of the barrel was 4,545 mm. The rifled part of the gun was 3,792 mm long with a diameter of 240 mm. The original powder chamber was 713 mm long with a diameter of 246 mm. In between was the transitional cone of 40 mm. There were 36 grooves which were 14.44 mm wide and 1.5 mm deep. The twist was progressive, going from an initial 0° 30' to 4° at the muzzle.

The gun originally used a charge of 28 kg of Wetteren 20/25 gunpowder or a slightly larger charge of 30 kg of AS 26/34 gunpowder. This gave the 144 kg projectile a velocity of 440 m/s. It gave the 120 kg projectile a velocity of 474 m/s. In both cases, peak pressure was about 2,200 kg/cm^{3}.

Penetrative power at the muzzle was 28 cm of iron backed by 84 cm of wood. The range of the gun was 10,000 m.

=== Ship carriages ===
At the time that the Canon de 24 C modèle 1870 was introduced, there were still a lot of ships that had a battery, e.g. as a Central battery ship instead of using turrets or barbettes.

The affût de batterie à châssis Modèle 1864 and 1867 were carriages consisting of an upper carriage (affût) that slid over a lower frame (châssis). The recoil was caught by a compressor brake. These carriages weighed 6,650 and 6,200 kg. The M 1864 could elevate to 9 degrees and incline to 8 degrees. For the M 1867 this was 11 and 6 degrees.

The carriage 'affût à plate-forme tournante pour tourelle de frégate cuirassée' was designed for the tourelles of the Océan-class ironclads. This carriage or platform turned inside of the fixed armored turret. The upper carriage was very similar to the M 1867. The main difference was that it was higher, allowing the gun to elevate to 21 degrees and incline to 6 degrees. This carriage weighed 18,902 kg.

The carriage 'affût a chassis pour tourelle mobile de garde-côtes was designed for the coastal gunboats of the Cerbère class. This carriage allowed elevation to 11 degrees and declination to 6 degrees. It weighed 6,200 kg.

The carriage à pivot central et freins hydrauliques weighed 11,510 kg. The M 76 'de teugue' carriage was a bit higher than the M 67 and had mechanical aiming aids. It weighed 8,440 kg. It was used on the Colbert-class ironclads.

=== Coastal carriages ===
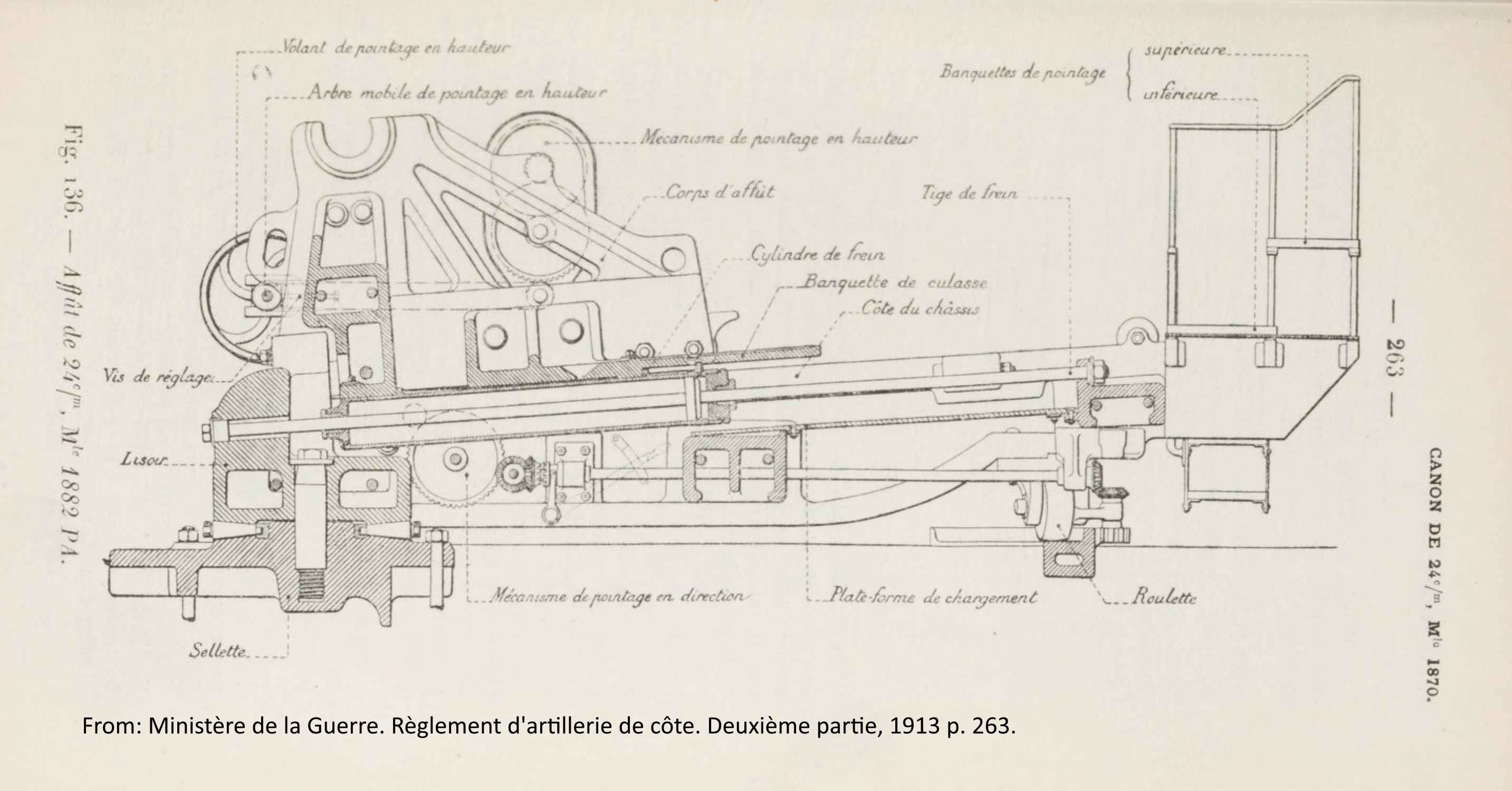
Coastal carriage M 1882 PA

In 1913 the gun was mentioned as being mounted on six different coastal carriages. One of these was the Affût de 24c/m Modèle 1882 PA. 'PA' stands for 'Pivot Anterieur', meaning front pivot. This carriage put the trunnions 2.054 m above the ground. It could decline to 7 degrees and elevate to 30 degrees. It could swing sidewards to cover an arc of 120 degrees. Weight was 8,700 kg for upper carriage, 13,500 kg for the frame, and 7,800 kg for the selette (see image) and rails of the platform. Including the gun, total weight was 45,000 kg.

=== Projectiles ===
The gun fired an armor piercing shot of 144 kg. This came in a chilled cast iron and a steel model. The regular grenade weighed 120 kg. There were also two kinds of canister shot. The one with large balls weighed 96 kg, that with small balls weighed 100 kg.

=== Durability & price ===
When firing with the service charge, the M 1870 was expected to be able to endure 500 shots. This was significantly less than the all-steel Krupp guns.

The cost price of the 24 C M 1870 was 20,013 francs, significantly more than the 12,094 of the previous M 1864.

== The modified 24 C 1870 M ==
In time, all 24 cm modèle 1870 guns were changed to become 24 C modèle 1870 M (M for Modifiée). This had to do with discoveries about how gunpowder exploded and how good quality slower burning powders could be made. For France this was a kind of so-called Wetteren gunpowder, made in Belgium. It soon became apparent that with a higher charge of slower-burning gunpowder, higher velocities could be achieved without dangerous peak pressures occurring.

In order to use a higher charge, the size of the powder chamber of the 24 C modèle 1870 was increased. This was not only necessary to hold the higher charge, but also to give it enough space to explode calmly. This change was applied to all the M^{le} 1870 guns.

The modèle 1870 M used a charge of 46 kg of Wetteren 25/30 gunpowder. This gave the AP shot an initial velocity of 495 m/s. For the regular grenade, this was 500 m/s. Respective peak pressures were 2,500 and 2,100 kg/cm^{3}.

The penetrative power of the 1870 M was significantly better. At the muzzle, it was 84 cm of wood covered by 34 cm of iron. At 10,800 m, the range of the modified gun was also better.

== Use ==
=== French Navy ===
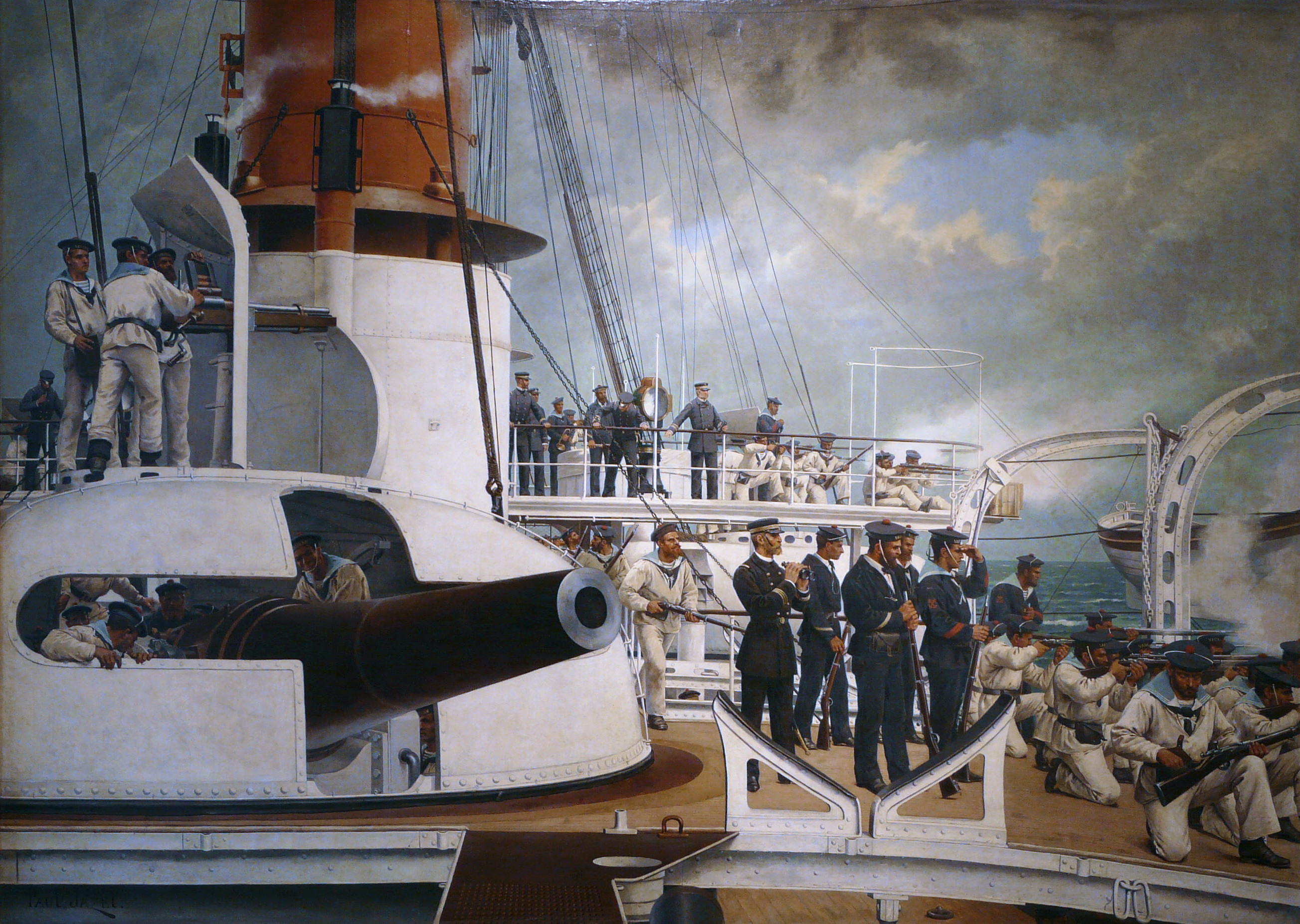
On board Vauban

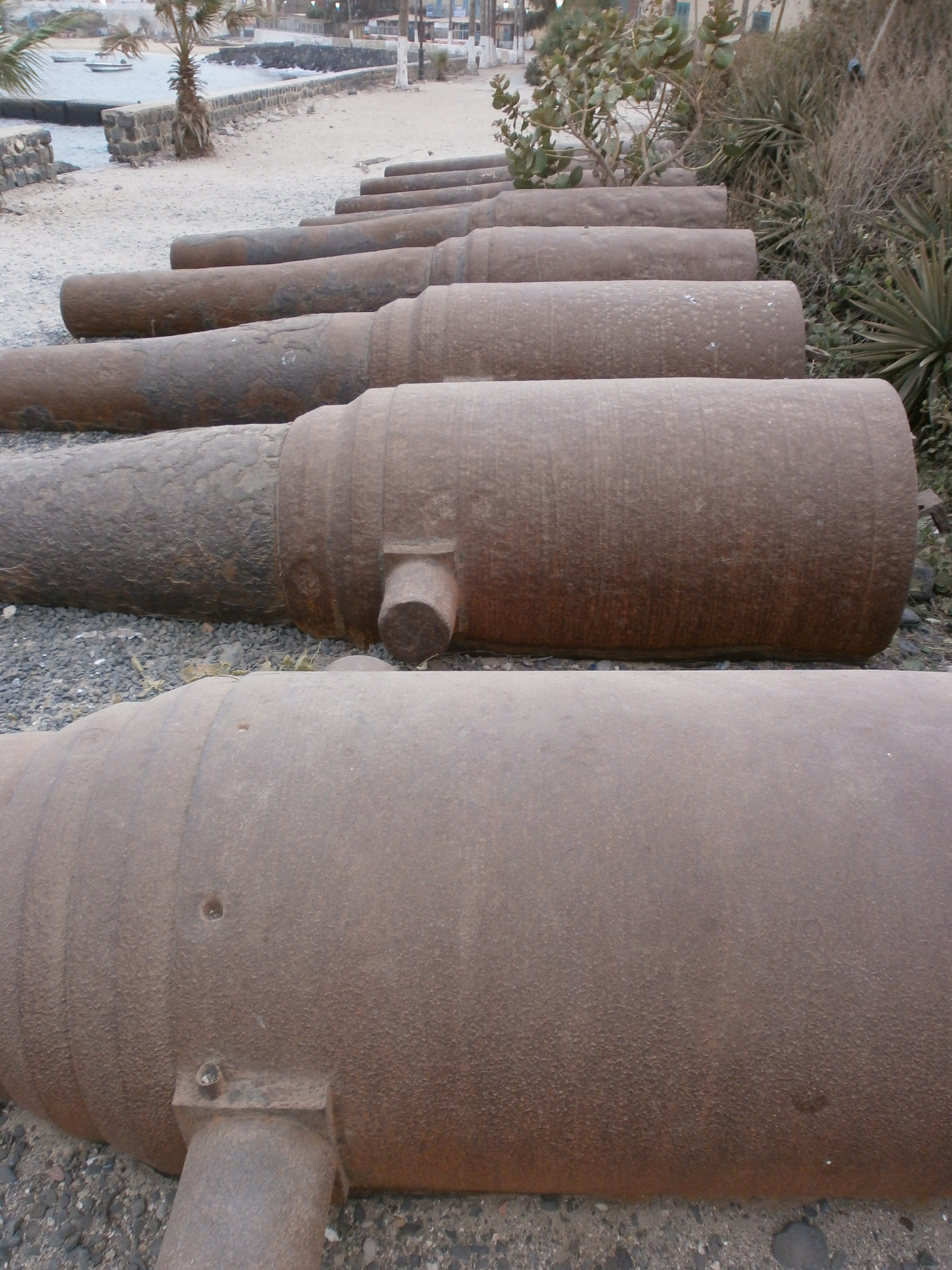
At Gorée

The French navy used the Canon de 24 C modèle 1870 as upper deck or chase on some of its biggest ships. The ironclad Richelieu had four Canon de 24 C modèle 1870 mounted en barbette and one mounted as a chase gun. This was alongside four heavier 27 c modèle 1870. The Colbert-class ironclads had one, later two 24 cm guns as chase guns next to 8 27 cm guns. The three Océan-class ironclads each had four 24 C modèle 1870 in single barbettes next to four 27 c modèle 1870 in the lower battery. The big old ironclad Couronne was re-armed with eight 24 C modèle 1870 guns in April 1876.

On smaller units, the gun was used as main armament. The Vauban-class ironclads had four 24 C modèle 1870. This also applied to the Bayard-class ironclads. The La Galissonnière-class ironclad had six Canon de 24 C modèle 1870.

The very small Bélier-class rams also known as Cerbère class had two 24 cm M 1870 guns.

=== French coastal defense ===
The French Navy was also responsible for some coastal defense tasks that involved the use of coastal guns. For coastal defense, the navy also planned to procure the 24 C modèle 1870 gun. However, after the Franco-Prussian War, the navy had to hand over these guns to the army. The army then changed these guns, which became the Canon de 24 C modèle 1876 which got a different breech and obturator. However, these modèle 1876 guns also had a different overall length, so it seems they were different from the start.

However, in e.g. 1913 there were only two 24 cm guns in use for coastal defense by the ministry of war: The 24 C modèle 1870-87 and our 24 C modèle 1870 which was about to be phased out for coastal defense. The 24 C modèle 1870 was also mentioned to use six different heavy carriages with either a front or central pivot.

At Gorée, four 24 C modèle 1870 were mounted at fort d'Estrées somewhere after April 1881. These now lay outside the fort.

=== Other nations ===
Denmark used a coastal gun that was comparable to the 24 C M 1870. The barrel of this gun was made at Finspong in Sweden.

Sweden used a coastal gun that was comparable to the 24 cm M 1870.
