= Bélier-class ram =

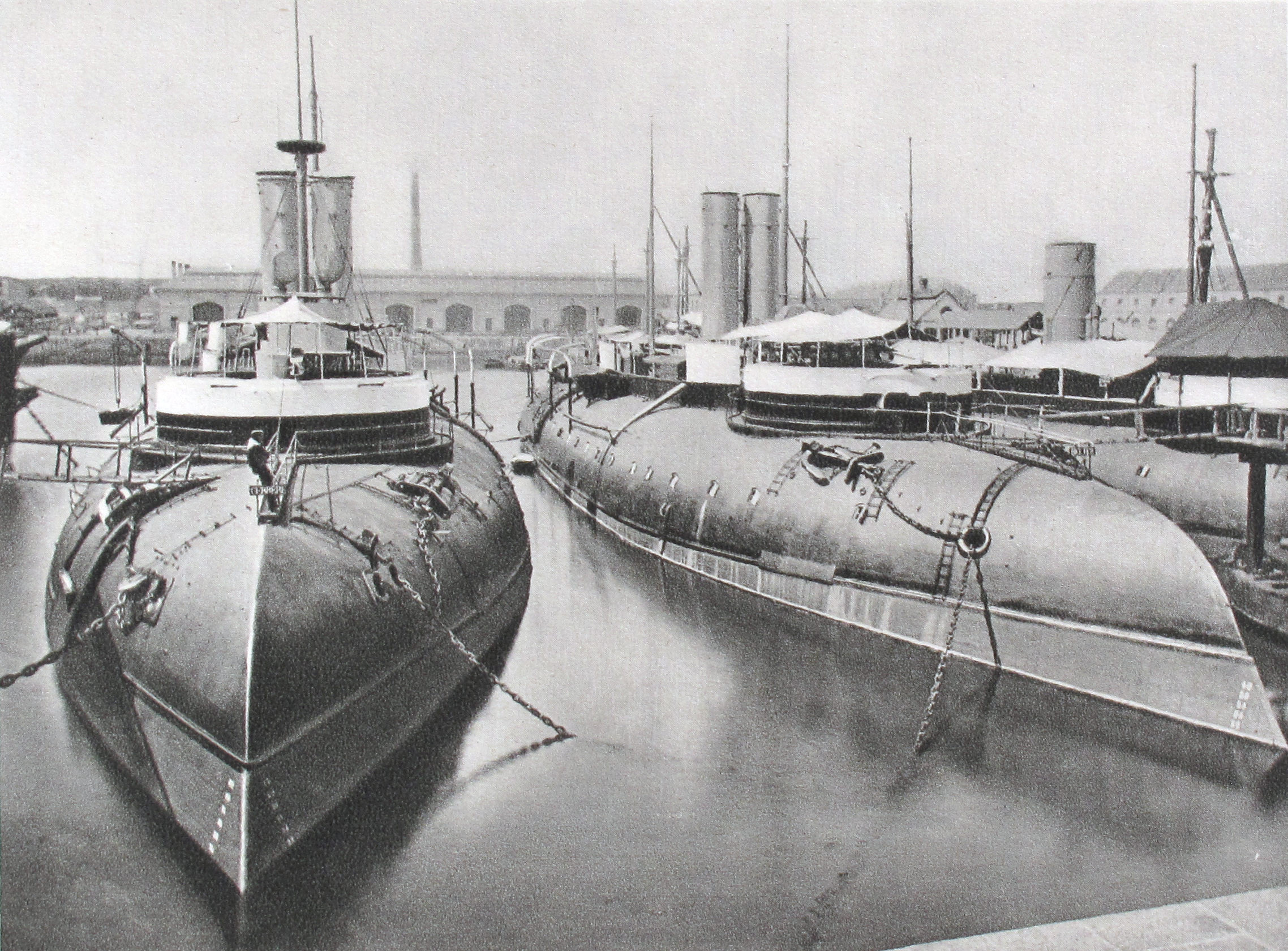
- Cerbère and Bélier

Class overview
- Name: Bélier class
- Builders: Arsenal de Cherbourg; Arsenal de Lorient; Arsenal de Brest; Arsenal de Rochefort
- Operators: French Navy
- Preceded by: Taureau
- Built: 1865–1874
- In service: 1868–1897
- Planned: 4
- Completed: 4
- Scrapped: 4

General characteristics
- Type: Ironclad ram
- Displacement: 3,589 tonnes (3,532 long tons)
- Length: 72 m (236 ft 3 in) (oa)
- Beam: 16.14 m (52 ft 11 in)
- Draft: 5.83 m (19 ft 2 in)
- Installed power: 6 boilers; 2,120 ihp (1,580 kW)
- Propulsion: 2 × screws; 2 × return connecting rod engines
- Speed: 12 kn (22 km/h; 14 mph)
- Range: 1,800 nmi (3,300 km; 2,100 mi) at 10 knots (19 km/h; 12 mph)
- Complement: 147
- Armament: 2 × 240 mm (9.4 in) guns
- Armor: Waterline belt: 220 mm (8.7 in); Gun turret: 180 mm (7.1 in); Deck: 15 or 20 mm (0.6 or 0.8 in)

The Bélier class, sometimes called the Cerbère class, consisted of four ironclad rams built for the French Navy in the 1870s.

== Design and development ==
The primary role of the preceding ironclad ram, Taureau, was to defend the French coast with its primary weapon being its ram. While that ship was still under construction the French Navy decided that it needed ships capable of attacking enemy coastal fortifications using its guns while retaining a ram. The naval architect Henri Dupuy de Lôme also increased the thickness of the Bélier class's armor to counter the increasing power of naval guns since Taureau had been designed.

The Bélier-class ships had an overall length of 72 m (236 ft 3 in), a beam of 16.14 m (52 ft 11 in) and a draft of 5.83 m (19.1 ft). They displaced 3,589 metric tons (3,532 long tons). They were powered by a pair of two-cylinder direct-acting steam engines that used steam provided by six boilers to drive each propeller shaft. The engine cylinders had a bore of 1.202 meters (3 ft 11 in) and a stroke of 0.7 meters (2 ft 4 in). The engines were rated at a total of 2,120 indicated horsepower (1,580 kW) that was intended to give the ships a speed of 12 knots (22 km/h; 14 mph). During her sea trials in July 1872, Bélier reached a speed of 12.37 knots (22.91 km/h; 14.24 mph) from 1,921 ihp (1,432 kW) and a boiler pressure of 1.836 kilograms per square centimetre (26.1 psi). The ships carried a maximum of 187 t (184 long tons) of coal that gave them a range of 1,800 nautical miles (3,300 km; 2,100 mi) at a speed of 10 knots (19 km/h; 12 mph). They had a metacentric height of 2.3 m (7.6 ft). The ship's complement numbered 147 sailors of all ranks.

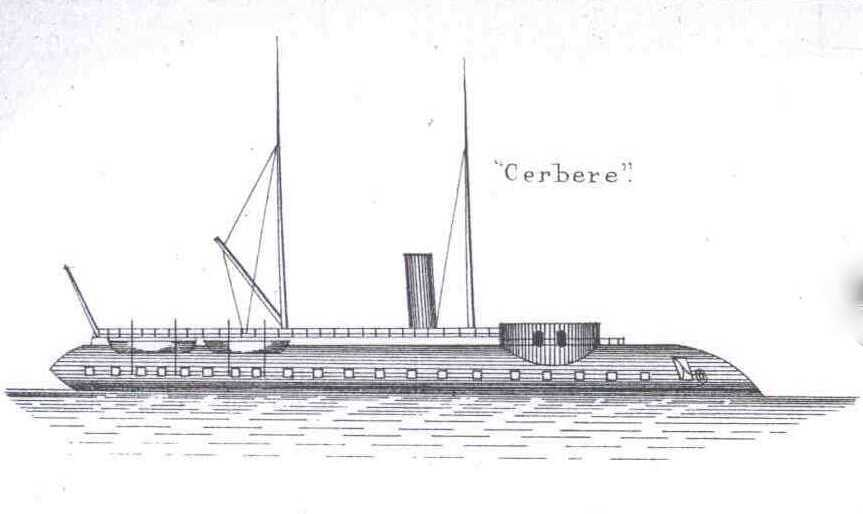
Cerbère class

The Bélier class carried a main battery of two 24 cm (9.4 in) Mle 1864 or 1870 rifled breech-loading guns in a turret in the bow. The ships were protected by a full-length waterline belt of wrought iron that was 220 mm (8.7 in) thick. This had a total height of 2.2 m (7 ft 3 in) of which 1.7 m (5 ft 7 in) was below the waterline and 0.5 m (1 ft 8 in) above it. The turret sat above a barbette that housed the turret machinery; both had armor 180 mm (7.1 in) thick. The deck armor was 15 mm (0.6 in) thick in Bélier and Cerbère and 20 mm (0.8 in) in the other two.

== Ships ==
Name	Built	Laid down	Launched	Completed	Fate
Bélier	Arsenal de Cherbourg	1 April 1865	29 August 1870	10 June 1872	Struck 8 July 1896
Bouledogue	Arsenal de Lorient	5 December 1865	26 March 1872	16 April 1873	Struck 24 April 1896
Cerbère	Arsenal de Brest	14 September 1865	23 April 1868	20 September 1868	Struck 11 December 1886
Tigre	Arsenal de Rochefort	1 April 1865	9 March 1871	20 July 1874	Struck 13 February 1892

== Sources ==
- Campbell, N. J. M. (1979). "France". In Chesneau, Roger & Kolesnik, Eugene M. (eds.). Conway's All the World's Fighting Ships 1860–1905. New York: Mayflower Books. pp. 283–333. ISBN 0-8317-0302-4.
- Caruna, Joseph (September 1971). "Warship Information Service". Warship International. Vol. 8, no. 3. pp. 290–317. JSTOR 44887494.
- Gille, Eric (1999). Cent ans de cuirassés français [A Century of French Battleships] (in French). Nantes: Marines édition. ISBN 2-909-675-50-5.
- Roberts, Stephen S. (2021). French Warships in the Age of Steam 1859–1914: Design, Construction, Careers and Fates. Barnsley, UK: Seaforth Publishing. ISBN 978-1-5267-4533-0.
