= Return connecting rod engine =

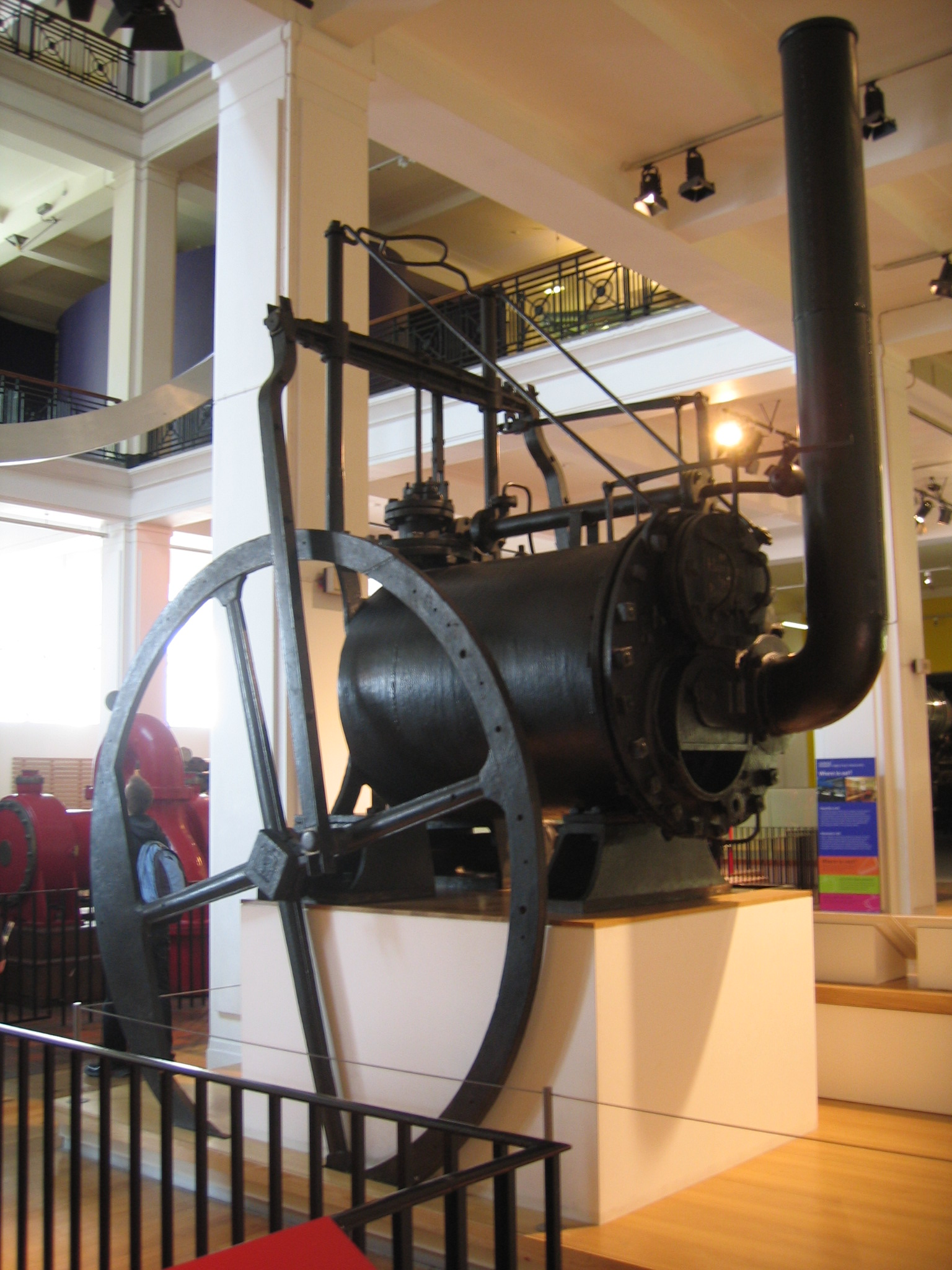
Trevithick's stationary engine of 1806

A return connecting rod, return piston rod (Note: 'Return piston rod' was a term used by naval engine builders Humphrys and Tennant.) or (in marine parlance) double piston rod engine or back-acting engine is a particular layout for a steam engine.

The key attribute of this layout is that the piston rod emerges from the cylinder to the crosshead, but the connecting rod then reverses direction and goes backwards to the crankshaft. This layout is compact, but has mechanical disadvantages. Return connecting rod engines were thus rarely used, except in some mid-19th century marine applications where they had certain advantages.

The return connecting rod layout has two possible forms:

- The cylinder is between the crosshead and the crankshaft. This requires long connecting rods. To avoid unbalanced forces on the crosshead, these rods are usually paired and run either side of the cylinder.
- The crankshaft is between the crosshead and cylinder. This requires a paired piston rod or yoke, so as to pass around the crankshaft.

Both horizontal and vertical arrangements have used the return connecting rod layout. Vertical return connecting rod engines used the original 'vertical' layout, with the cylinder facing upwards to the crosshead. (Note: Although rare today, this was the original layout for all atmospheric and steam engines. The cylinder sat directly atop the boiler below. Even with the development of separate boilers, it was still considered simpler for access to place the large, heavy cylinder low down and with the lighter cranks above. The form of vertical engine that became more common in later years, with the cylinder facing downwards, was originally termed the 'inverted vertical'.)

== Table and Steeple engines ==
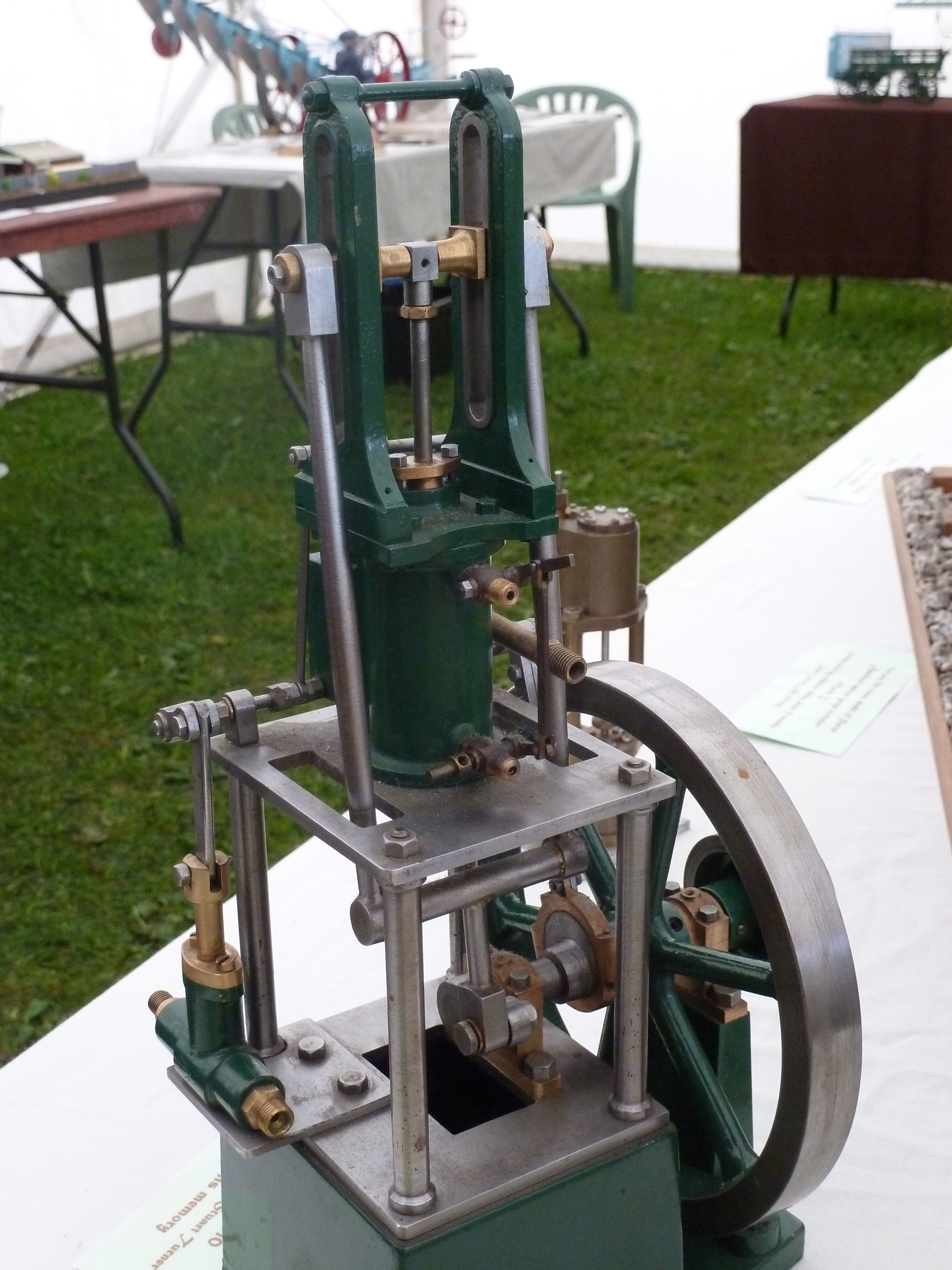
Model table engine, showing the forked connecting rod

'Table' and 'steeple' engines are vertical stationary engines with return connecting rods.

=== Table engines ===
Table engines place the cylinder above and between the crankshaft and the crosshead. They saw widespread manufacture by Maudslay from around 1805 and were used to supply power to small engineering workshops. They were especially popular for driving lineshafting, as they could operate at a higher speed than beam engines.

Like the smaller grasshopper beam engines, an advantage for Maudslay's table engines was that they could be made in factories as a complete unit. This included their large cast iron baseplate or table. Unlike horizontal engines and house-built beam engines, they did not require the construction of a large and carefully aligned masonry foundation at the engine's site. Engines could also be made in advance and sold 'off the shelf'. Although this had cost savings, it was mostly beneficial because it was quicker than commissioning the building of an engine and engine house to go with it.

=== Steeple engines ===
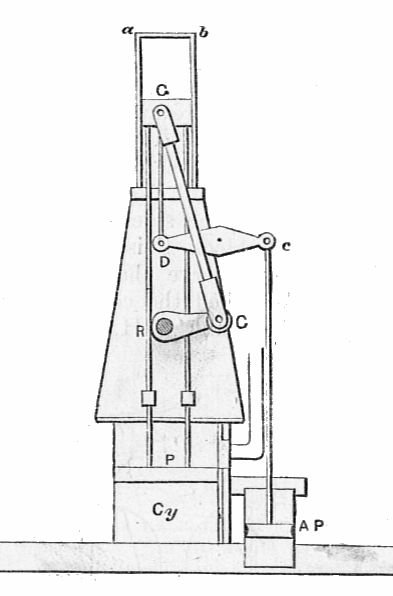
Steeple engine

Steeple engines place the crankshaft above the cylinder, between it and the crosshead. They use paired piston rods, two or even four, from the piston to the crosshead, to avoid the crankshaft. Another pattern used a triangular yoke on the single piston rod, allowing the crankshaft to pass through it.

Steeple engines were mostly used as marine engines. Some American paddlewheel riverboats had especially large steeples that towered over their deckhouse.

The term 'steeple engine' was also used later to refer to inverted-vertical tandem-compound engines, owing to their great height. (Note: A tandem compound places both high and low pressure cylinders, sometimes even a third intermediate pressure cylinder, in-line on the same piston rod.) These were not return connecting rod engines.

== Locomotives ==
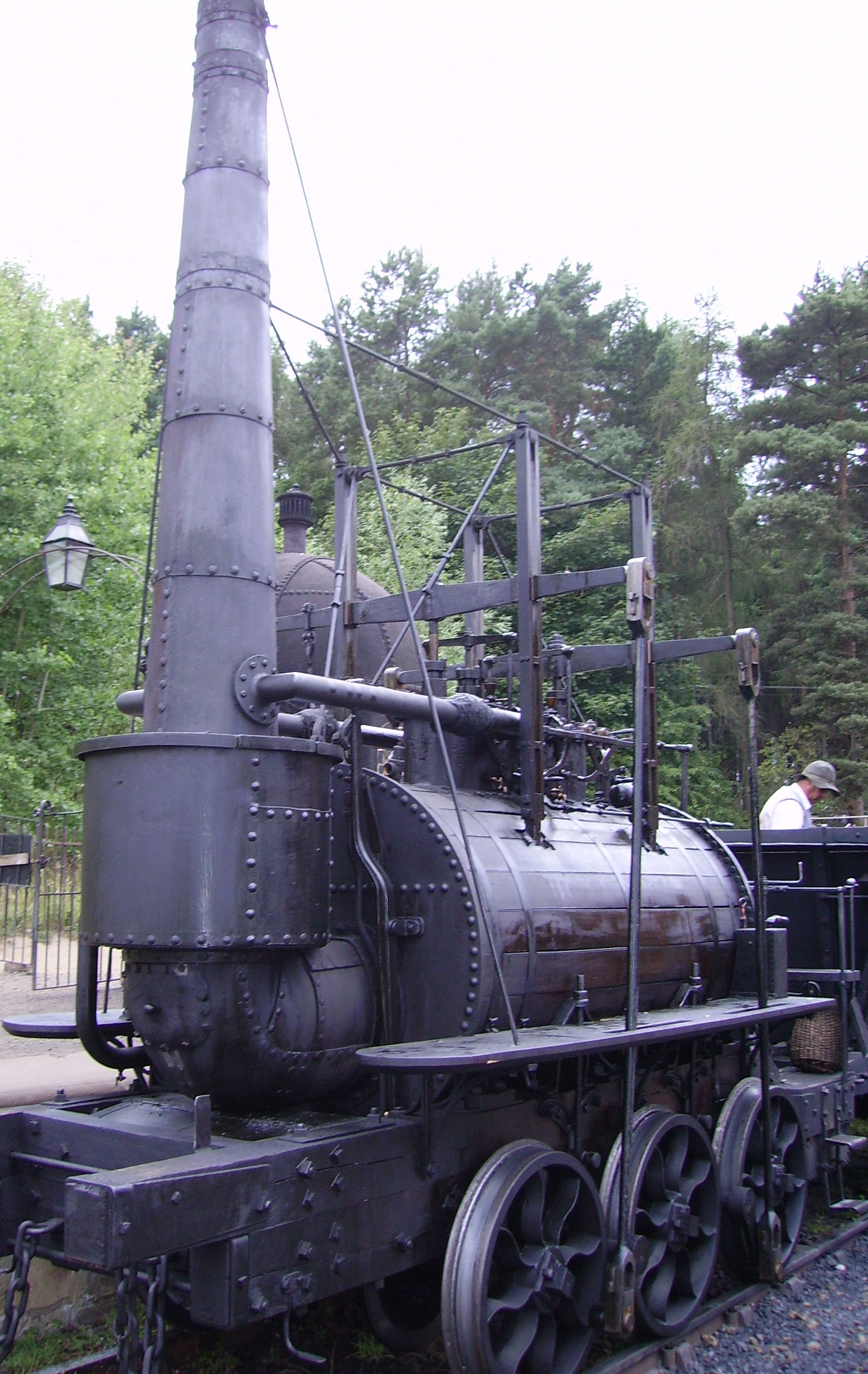
Steam Elephant (replica)

Trevithick's first high-pressure engines from 1801 onwards, including his locomotives, used the return connecting rod layout in both horizontal and vertical arrangements. The cylinders were embedded within the boiler, to avoid heat loss, and the short boiler also formed the frame of the engine. This made the return connecting rod a natural layout, with the crankshaft at the opposite end of the boiler from the crosshead. The paired connecting rods were relatively simple components, even though two were required. As they also allowed the crankshaft to use two simple overhung cranks on the ends of the shaft, rather than a complex forged crankshaft with an internal crank, this was also a valuable simplification.

Other early steam locomotives such as Murray's Salamanca (1812) and George Stephenson's Blücher (1815) and Locomotion (1825) also used return connecting rod engines. These all had heavy vertical cylinders set in tandem within the boiler barrel, driving through transverse crossheads above the locomotive, supported by swinging links. The complexity of this motion led to it being named 'the knitting' by drivers. The swinging link was simpler than Watt's earlier parallel motion and did not constrain the crosshead to move in such an accurate straight line. However the additional length of the connecting rods for a return connecting rod engine, relative to the piston stroke, made this angulation effect less serious. The Steam Elephant used a rudimentary set of slidebars to support the crosshead instead.

The use of a return connecting rod to a shaft beneath the boiler with overhung cranks also avoided the need for an internal crank. For Stephenson's designs, this crank axle would also have carried the locomotive's weight, not being merely a crankshaft, and so this avoided a particularly difficult piece of forging work.

One of the last locomotives to use return connecting rods was Ericsson and Braithwaite's Novelty at the Rainhill trials.

Abandonment of return connecting rod designs

Hedley's Puffing Billy, a contemporary of Blücher, avoided the return connecting rod in favour of a grasshopper beam. The cylinders were now mounted side by side, but were still large, heavy and mounted as an integral part of the boiler. Although a beam engine has a similar layout to a return connecting rod engine, in that the piston rod points in one direction and the connecting rod runs backwards from this, beam engines are not considered as return connecting rod engines. Stephenson's manager Hackworth's locomotive Royal George inverted the design to having the cylinders, still vertical, face downwards directly onto the crankshaft. By the time of Stephenson's Rocket, particularly as the new fire-tube boiler locomotives became lighter and faster, it was recognised that vertical cylinders caused hammer blow on the flimsy fishbelly rails of the time. Rocket was built with cylinders inclined at 45° but was soon rebuilt to place them near-horizontally. Since then, almost all steam locomotives have had their cylinders placed close to horizontal.

== Marine steam engines ==
=== Paddle ships ===
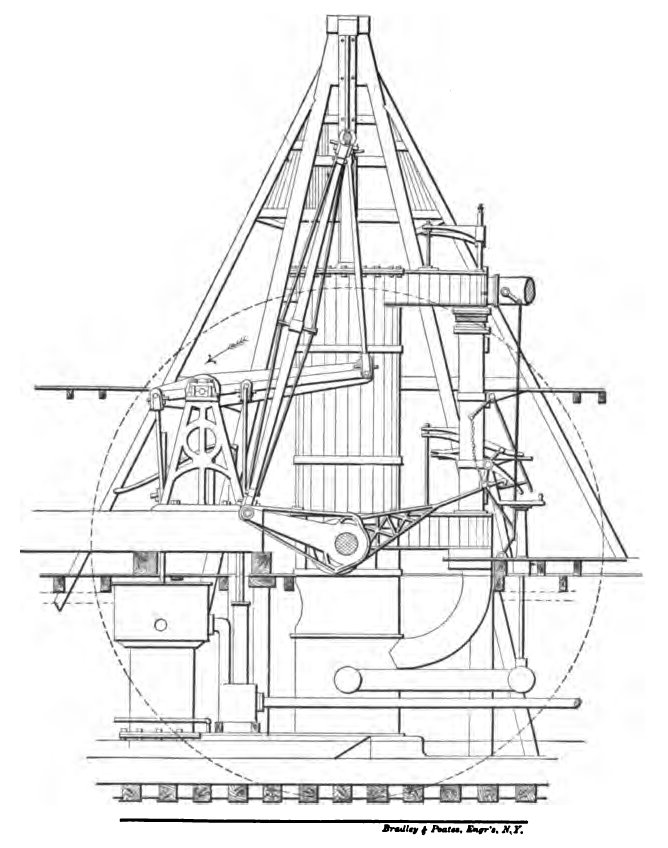
Crosshead ("square") engine of the Hudson River steamboat PS Belle

The first marine steam engines drove paddlewheels. Paddles require a relatively high axle, that often also forms the crankshaft. For stability the main weight of the engine, i.e. its cylinder, is mounted low down. Later engines drove single screw propellers. These now required a low-mounted drive, but still benefited from the stability effect of a low-set engine. Such early engines, constrained by the technology of the time, worked at low boiler pressures and slow piston speeds. Together with the short piston stroke constrained by lack of space for the engine, (Note: American sternwheel paddlesteamers used longitudinal horizontal engines that allowed a long stroke. These developed as long, small diameter engines of a distinctly different pattern from any other marine engines. In contrast, American sidewheel paddlesteamers favoured particularly tall upright steeple or walking beam engines.) these early engines required large diameter cylinders in order to develop enough power.

==== Crosshead engines ====
Crosshead, 'double crosshead' or 'square' engines were vertical engines analogous in layout to the table engine, with their cylinder above the crankshaft. The crosshead needed to be very wide, to allow the connecting rods to pass either side of the large cylinder, which in turn required a large supporting frame for the slidebars. They were popular for early American riverboats and their large wooden A frame crosshead supports were a distinctive feature. Larger engines became top-heavy and so the design was replaced by steeple or walking beam engines.

==== Steeple engines ====
European practice, particularly on the Clyde, favoured Napier's steeple engine instead of the square engine. These were more complicated to construct and used more ironwork, but they placed the cylinder beneath the crankshaft and so were more stable in a narrow hull. Neither form was popular for sea-going vessels.

=== Screw propulsion ===
In marine practice, the return connecting rod engine for screw propulsion was termed the back-acting(US parlance) or double piston rod engine.

==== Trunk engines ====
John Penn patented the trunk engine in 1848. This was a design to allow a particularly short engine (measured in the direction of its piston rod), that was also able to support a large diameter piston. (Note: A prevalent theory at the time was concerned about the effects of wear on the pistons of horizontal engines, owing to the weight of the piston. Pistons were thus provided with extensive support from their piston and tail rods, rather than allowing any weight to rest directly on the cylinder wall.) They were mounted transversely, usually as two cylinder engines, and used for naval ships with relatively high installed power. A trunk engine achieves its short length by having a large diameter, hollow piston rod or 'trunk'. The gudgeon pin of the connecting rod is mounted inside this trunk, allowing the overall length of the two man components, the piston rod and connecting rod, to be telescoped together. As the trunk must be large enough to allow for the angulation of the connecting rod as the crank rotates, this design is limited to large diameter engines. It was also found that as boiler pressure increased, the large diameter seal around the trunk was increasingly prone to leaking.

==== Double piston rod engines ====
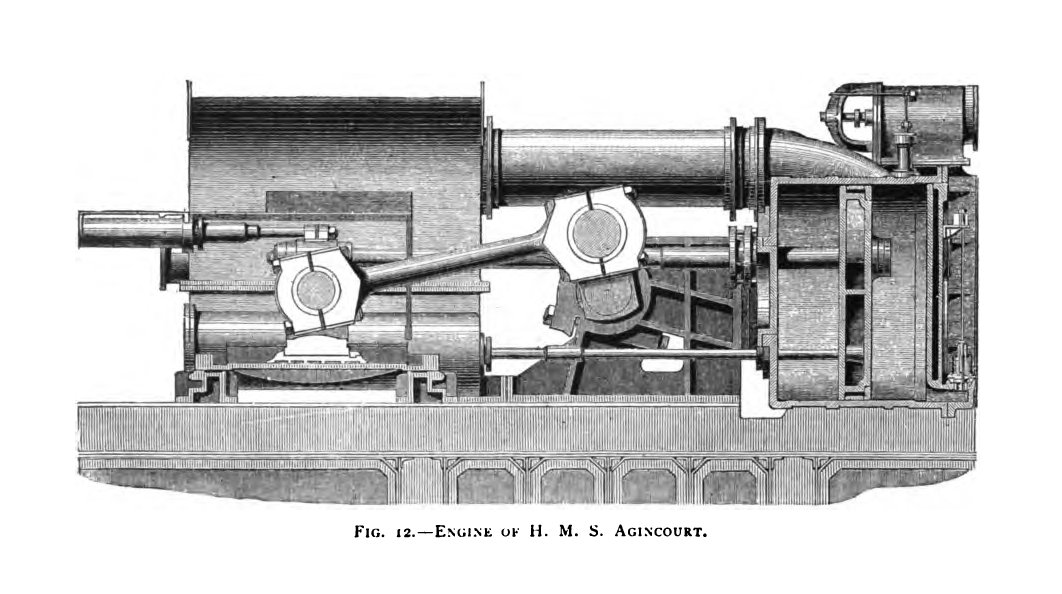
Double piston rod engine of screw-driven HMS Agincourt (1865) Cylinder and piston are to the right, condenser and air pump to the left.

The trunk engine was largely replaced by the double piston-rod engine. This was a return connecting rod engine, with the crankshaft between the crosshead and cylinder. Four piston rods were used to pass around the crankshaft, both above and below, and also to each side of the crank, as the crank throw was wider than the vertical spacing of the piston rods. As most of these engines were parallel compounds, two piston rods would be taken from each of the HP and LP pistons. In some engines, double rods were used from the large LP cylinder and a single rod from the HP cylinder, with a yoke to pass around the crankshaft. Double piston rods could also be used from a simple engine, but these required an overhung gudgeon pin on the crosshead, so tended to be limited to smaller engines. An advantage of the double piston rod engine over the trunk was that both ends of the connecting rod were accessible for maintenance. One factor learned from naval use of horizontal cylinders was that, despite previous fears, there was little additional wear owing to the piston's weight resting on the cylinder.

An Admiralty committee of 1858 recommended strongly that older engine designs be abandoned in favour of rationalisation on only three designs: the single piston rod engine (the most recognisable type today), the trunk engine and the double piston rod.

A later variant of the trunk engine re-visited the return connecting rod layout as the vibrating lever or half-trunk engine. This was a paired engine with two short-stroke trunk engines facing outwards. Their connecting rods from the pistons led to upright 'vibrating levers' that could rock back and forth. These levers rotated a short axle shaft with further levers on it that in turn drove another pair of connecting rods and a shared central crankshaft. These complex engines were the invention of the Swedish-American engineer John Ericsson and were little used outside these two countries.

==== Maudslay's siamese engine ====
Other compact alternatives to the return connecting rod or trunk engines were Maudslay's siamese engine and the rare annular piston engine. Like the trunk engine, these placed the gudgeon pin within the length of the piston stroke by having a pair of pistons and a T-shaped crosshead that could relocate the gudgeon pin behind its usual position.

=== Builders ===
- Humphrys, Tennant and Dykes (later named Humphrys, Tenant & Co)
- Maudslay
- Penn

== Directly coupled pumps and blowing engines ==
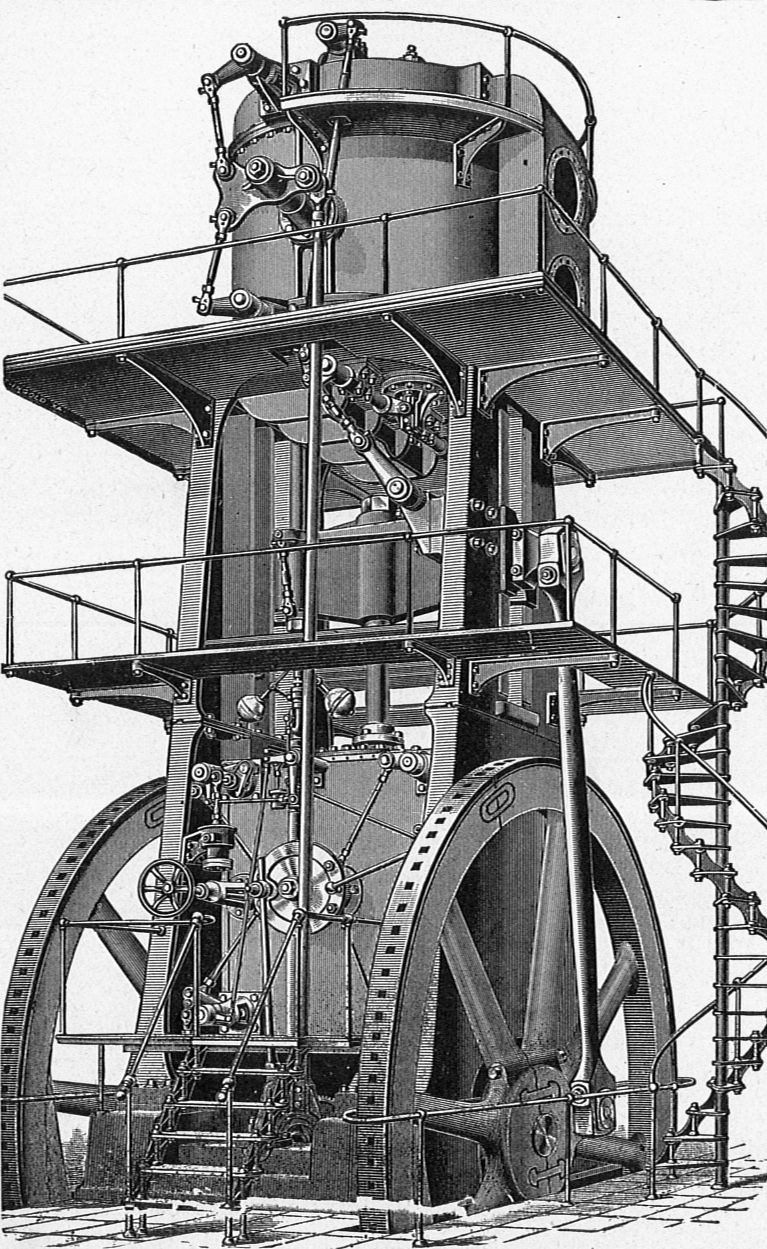
Vertical blowing engine

A blowing engine is a large stationary steam engine directly coupled to air pumping cylinders. They are used to provide the air blast for blast furnaces and other forms of smelter. As the working cylinder and the driven load are both reciprocating pistons, they may be directly coupled by their piston rod. The connecting rod is only used to drive a flywheel whose inertia balances load through the cycle of the engine, not as an output shaft. These engines were some of the last new return connecting rod designs to be built.

The large vertical blowing engine illustrated was built in the 1890s by E. P. Allis Co. of Milwaukee (later to form part of Allis-Chalmers). The air pumping cylinder is above the steam power cylinder and crosshead. The main force of the piston is transmitted to the air cylinder by a purely reciprocating action and the flywheels are there merely to smooth the action of the engine. The flywheel shaft is mounted below the steam piston, the paired connecting rods driving downwards and backwards.

Similar pumping engines were also used in waterworks. Inverted vertical engines had their cylinder at the top and water ram pumps at their base, or in a borehole below them. A crankshaft and flywheels were provided in the space between these, for smoother running rather than rotary power output. These were driven from the lower (pump) yoke, by short return connecting rods. Two Worth McKenzie engines of this type; a triple-expansion engine on 1895 and a duplex simple of 1906 were installed at the Waterworks Museum, Hereford, Hereford and are preserved in steam there.
