= French ironclad Taureau =

Coastal defence ship of the French Navy

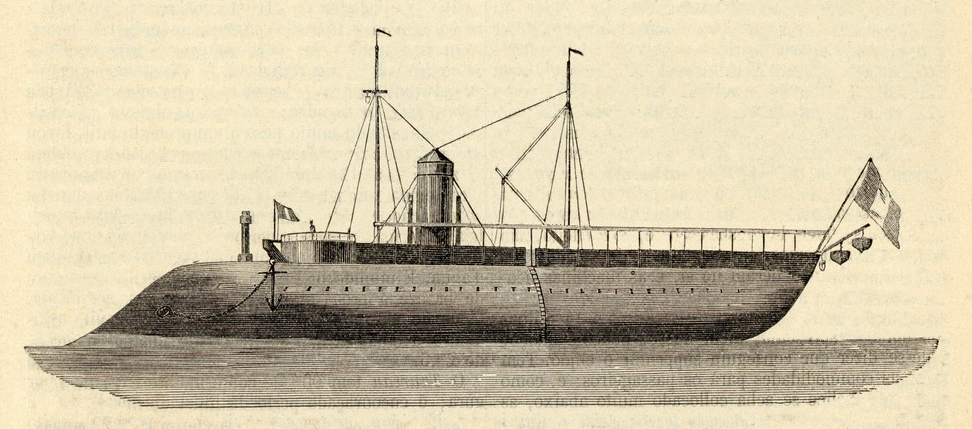
- Lithograph of Taureau from 1866

Class overview
- Preceded by: None
- Succeeded by: Bélier class
- Completed: 1

History

France
- Name: Taureau
- Ordered: 5 September 1863
- Builder: Dyd and Indret, Toulon
- Laid down: 5 October 1863
- Launched: 10 June 1865
- Commissioned: 19 August 1865
- Stricken: 25 October 1890
- Fate: Sold to be broken up 11 August 1891

General characteristics
- Type: Coastal-defense ship
- Displacement: 2,718 long tons (2,762 t) (deep load)
- Length: 59.92 m (196 ft 7 in) (p.p.)
- Beam: 14.5 m (47 ft 7 in)
- Draft: 5.356 m (17.57 ft)
- Installed power: 8 × boilers; 1,920 ihp (1,430 kW)
- Propulsion: 2 shafts, 2 steam engines
- Speed: 12.58 kn (23.30 km/h; 14.48 mph)
- Range: 1,250 nmi (2,320 km; 1,440 mi) at 10 kn (19 km/h; 12 mph)
- Complement: 150
- Armament: 1 × 11-long-ton (11 t) ram; 1 × single 240 mm (9.4 in) gun
- Armor: Belt: 150 mm (5.9 in); Deck: 50 mm (2 in); Turrets: 120 mm (4.7 in)

Taureau was the first ironclad coastal defence ship (garde-côtes cuirassé) built for the French Navy (Marine Nationale). Launched in 1865, the vessel was a one-off design that had a primary armament of a single 11-ton bronze ram complemented by a single 240 mm (9.4 in) gun. She was variously known as an armoured ram, steam ram and screw-powered turret ship for the defence of roadsteads (batterie à hélice et à tour pour la defense des rades). Despite having a high speed of 12.58 knots (23.3 km/h; 14.5 mph) and high manoeuvrability due to having a large rudder and two propeller shafts that enabled her to turn within her own length, the ship spent most of her career in reserve. The vessel was temporarily commissioned on 20 July 1870, ready to be deployed in the English Channel during the Franco-Prussian War, but saw no action. Taureau was removed from the fleet list in 1890 and was sold to be broken up in 1891.

== Design and development ==
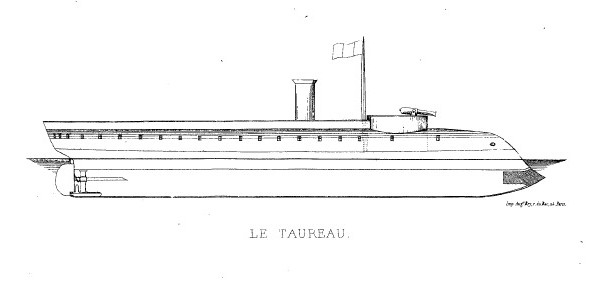
Taureau

Taureau was the first coastal defence ship to serve with the French Navy (Marine Nationale). The ship was designed as a small manoeuvrable strike weapon to engage with the larger ships of the British Royal Navy. As a pioneer for the type, the vessel was known by a number of names during her career. Initially, she was ordered as a screw-powered turret ship for the defence of roadsteads (batterie à hélice et à tour pour la defense des rades), but this was changed to Special project (Bâtiment spécial) in the January 1864 fleet list due to the unique nature of her design. As her launch date approached, she was given the same classification as monitors, coastal guard ship (garde-côtes cuirassé) in January 1865. A year later, she was named the sole first class coastal guard ship (garde-côtes cuirassé de 1er classe), although this was reverted to simply coastal guard ship two years later. The vessel was also known as an armoured, ironclad or steam ram.

Designed by Henri Dupuy de Lôme, Taureau was ordered by the Ministry of the Navy (Ministère de la Marine) Prosper de Chasseloup-Laubat on 5 September 1863 and the design approved four days later. The ship was constructed as an armoured tower sitting on an armoured raft with a deck that sat about 0.7 m (2 ft 4 in) above the waterline. The vessel displaced 2,718 long tons (3,044 short tons; 2,762 t) and had an overall length of 64 m (210 ft 0 in), 59.97 m (196 ft 9 in) at the waterline and 59.92 m (196 ft 7 in) between perpendiculars, a beam of 14.5 m (47 ft 7 in) and a mean draught of 5.356 m (17 ft 6.9 in).

The ship was powered by two horizontal simple-expansion steam engines with cylinders that were 1.2 m (3 ft 11 in) in diameter and had a stroke of 0.648 m (2 ft 1.5 in). Fed from eight boilers, the engine was rated at 1,920 indicated horsepower (1,430 kW) at 82 rpm and drove two propeller shafts. While undertaking sea trials, Taureau reached a speed of 12.58 knots (23.3 km/h; 14.5 mph) from 1,796 ihp (1,339 kW), a high speed for the time. The warship carried 171 tonnes (168 long tons; 188 short tons) of coal to give a range of 1,260 nautical miles (2,330 km; 1,450 mi) at a speed of 10 knots (19 km/h; 12 mph). The ship's complement numbered 150 sailors of all ranks.

Taureau had an armament built around a bronze ram that weighed 11 long tons (12 short tons; 11 t) and was mounted to the bow. It projected 3.2 m (10 ft 6 in) ahead of the overall length and had its tip 2.5 m (8 ft 2 in) below the waterline. As designed, the vessel was to also have a fixed forward-facing turret with two 240 mm (9.4 in) Modèle 1864 rifled breech-loading guns that were to be used to clear the way for the ram to strike. This was changed to a single rotating open turret mounting a single 240 mm M1864 gun that was mounted within a wooden barbette and fired over the top of the tower.

The ship had a waterline armour belt that was 150 mm (5.9 in) thick, 1.85 m (6 ft 1 in) high above the waterline and 0.35 m (1 ft 2 in) below. The turret had 120 mm (4.7 in) thick armour. The main deck was protected by 50-millimetre (2 in) iron plates on 120 mm of wood. All the armour was iron. The curved sides of a metal shell rose above the armoured hull as a wall to protect from boarding. This was complemented by the shape of the dome covering the deck, which was designed to be impossible to walk on. The subsequent Bélier class were similar, but could be distinguished by their two funnels.

== Construction and career ==
Named on 3 October 1863, Taureau was laid down on 5 October by Dyd and Indret at Toulon and launched on 10 June 1865. The ship was commissioned on 19 August 1865 and completed the following August. In coastal waters, Taureau proved to be highly manoeuvrable, able to turn in place by driving one shaft forward and the other in reverse. This was enhanced by the large rudder, short length and shallow draft. However, the vessel performed less well at sea and rolled badly.

After joining the navy, Taureau was initially deployed to Cherbourg on 5 August 1867 before being decommissioned there on 3 October. After being transferred to reserve on 16 July 1870, the ship was taken into full commission on 20 July ready to be deployed in the English Channel during the Franco-Prussian War. The ship took no part in the action as the navy achieved no strategic goals during the conflict. At the same time, the use of the ram as a weapon of war was also losing favour and the specialised nature of the ship meant she was no longer considered a capable front-line battleship. The ship was decommissioned on 23 March the following year and spent most of her subsequent career in reserve. Taureau was removed from the fleet list on 25 October 1890 and sold to be broken up on 11 August 1891.

== Bibliography ==
- Campbell, N. J. M. (1979). "France". In Chesneau, Roger & Kolesnik, Eugene M. (eds.). Conway's All the World's Fighting Ships 1860–1905. Greenwich, UK: Conway Maritime Press. pp. 282–333. ISBN 978-0-85177-133-5.
- Hamilton, C. I. (1993). Anglo-French Naval Rivalry, 1840–1870. Oxford: Clarendon Press. ISBN 978-0-19820-261-5.
- Hozier, Henry Montague (1871). The Franco-Prussian War. Vol. 2. London: William MacKenzie. OCLC 1068543818.
- Martin, Frederick (1871). Martin, Frederick (ed.). The Statesman's Yearbook: The Politics, Cultures and Economies of the World. London: Macmillan and Co. doi:10.1057/9780230253001. ISBN 978-0-230-25300-1. OCLC 609404898.
- Roberts, Stephen (2021). French Warships in the Age of Steam 1859–1914. Barnsley: Seaforth Publishing. ISBN 978-1-5267-4533-0.
