= Overall length =

The overall length (OAL) of an ammunition cartridge is a measurement from the base of the brass shell casing to the tip of the bullet, seated into the brass casing. Cartridge overall length (COL) is important to safe functioning of reloads in firearms.

Handloaded cartridges and commercially available cartridges for firearms are normally created with a maximum length standardized by the Sporting Arms and Ammunition Manufacturers' Institute (SAAMI). A cartridge's overall length may be shorter than the maximum standard, equal to the standard, or sometimes even longer.

The maximum overall length is dictated by the need to fit into a box magazine of standard manufacture. For example, the .223 Remington cartridge, when loaded for use in the AR-15 rifle (or the military's M16 rifle), has to fit into the removable box magazine for that rifle. This dictates that the cartridge's maximum overall length be no greater than 2.260". However, for competition purposes during off-hand and slow fire prone match stages, the .223 Remington is loaded one cartridge at a time into the rifle's receiver. This allows for the cartridge to be longer than the standardized 2.260" SAAMI maximum overall length. These cartridges can be safely loaded to a length that has the ogive portion of the bullet just touching the rifle's lands. Many competitive shooters will make these cartridges 0.005" less than the truly maximum allowable overall length, for the sake of safety.

It is desirable for these single-loaded cartridges to have as little bullet jump as possible before the bullet's ogive begins to be engraved by the rifle's lands. This minimized bullet jump increases the accuracy of the rifle, all else being equal. This practice of long-loading a cartridge must be adjusted for each individual rifle, since there are variations from rifle to rifle as to how far down the barrel the rifling begins.
