= French ironclad Vauban =

Ironclad warship of the French Navy

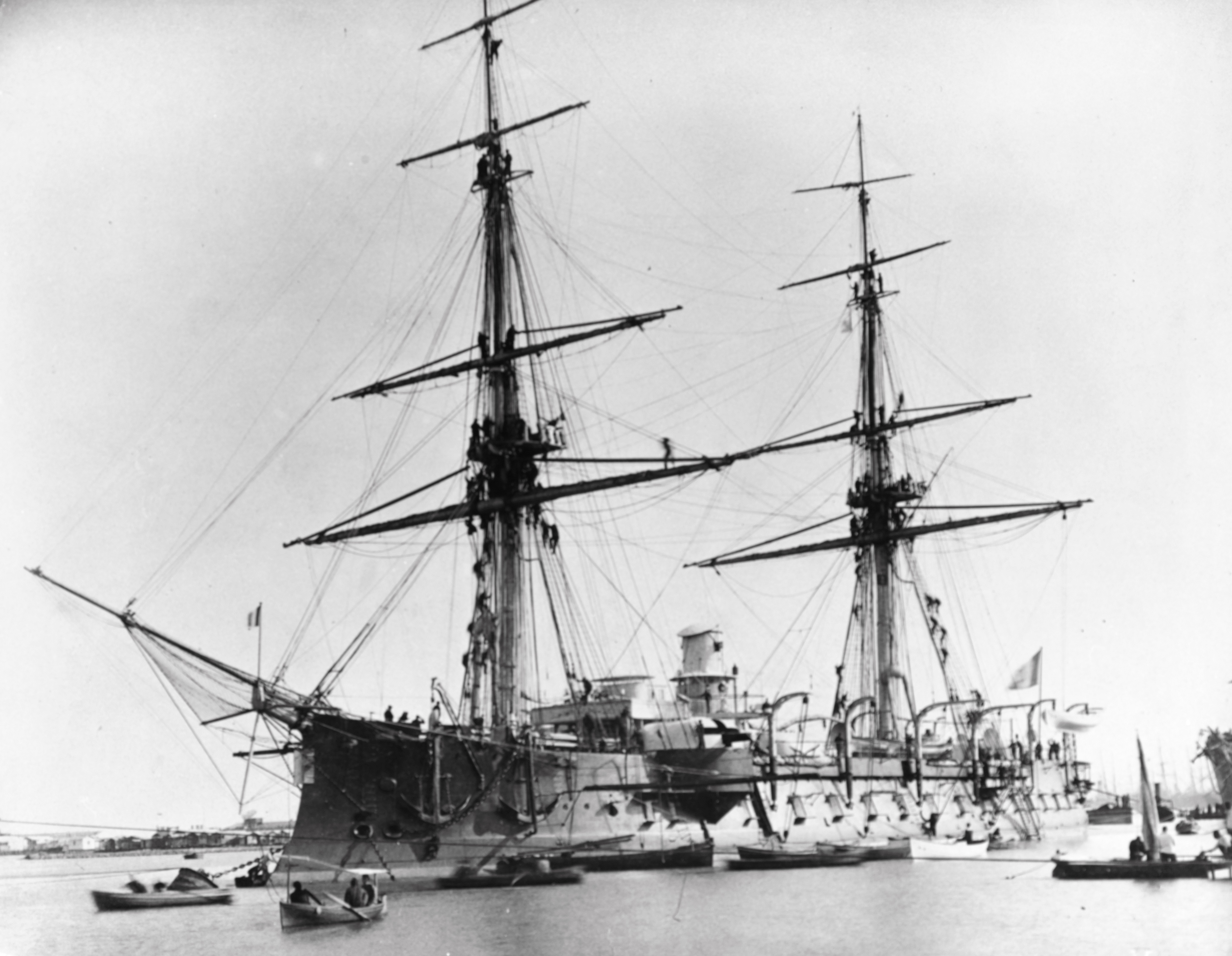
- Vauban as originally completed

History

France
- Name: Vauban
- Builder: Arsenal of Cherbourg
- Laid down: 1 August 1879
- Launched: 3 July 1882
- Commissioned: March 1885
- Stricken: 5 September 1905
- Fate: Sold, 1919

General characteristics
- Class & type: Vauban-class ironclad
- Displacement: 6,207.6 t (6,109.6 long tons; 6,842.7 short tons)
- Length: 84.7 m (277 ft 11 in) loa
- Beam: 17.45 m (57 ft)
- Draft: 7.39 m (24 ft 3 in)
- Installed power: 8 × fire-tube boilers; 4,000 indicated horsepower (3,000 kW)
- Propulsion: 2 × compound steam engines; 2 × screw propellers
- Speed: 14 kn (26 km/h; 16 mph)
- Range: 2,380.5 nmi (4,408.7 km; 2,739.4 mi) at 12.8 knots (23.7 km/h; 14.7 mph)
- Crew: 24 officers; 450 enlisted men
- Armament: 4 × 240 mm (9.4 in) guns; 1 × 194 mm (7.6 in) gun; 6 × 138.6 mm (5.46 in) guns; 12 × 37 mm (1.5 in) Hotchkiss revolver cannon; 2 × 356 mm (14 in) torpedo tubes
- Armor: Belt: 150 to 250 mm (5.9 to 9.8 in); Barbettes: 200 mm (7.9 in); Deck: 50 mm (2 in); Conning tower: 30 mm (1.2 in)

Vauban was the lead ship of the Vauban class of ironclad barbette ships built for the French Navy in the late 1870s and 1880s. Intended for service in the French colonial empire, she was designed as a "station ironclad", smaller versions of the first-rate vessels built for the main fleet. The Vauban class was a scaled down variant of Amiral Duperré. They carried their main battery of four 240 mm (9.4 in) guns in open barbettes, two forward side-by-side and the other two aft on the nautical. Vauban was laid down in 1879 and was completed in 1885.

Though Vauban had been intended for use overseas, she spent the majority of her career in French waters in the Mediterranean Squadron. During this period, she was primarily occupied with annual training exercises. By 1893, she was reduced to the Reserve Division. She was sent to French Indochina in 1899, though she was relieved in 1900. Her return to France proved to be short-lived, as the Boxer Uprising in Qing China prompted the French to send reinforcements to help suppress the rebellion. Vauban spent the next four years in East Asia, though she spent 1903 and 1904 in reserve in Saigon. She was struck from the naval register in 1905, though she served as a depot ship for another nine years. She eventually was sold for scrap in 1919.

== Design ==
Profile, upper deck, and battery deck drawing of the Vauban class

The Vauban class of barbette ships was designed in the late 1870s as part of a naval construction program that began under the post-Franco-Prussian War fleet plan of 1872. At the time, the French Navy categorized its capital ships as high-seas ships for the main fleet, station ironclads for use in the French colonial empire, and smaller coastal defense ships. The Vauban class was intended to serve in the second role, and they were based on the high-seas ironclad Amiral Duperré, albeit a scaled-down version. Unlike their wooden-hulled predecessors of the Bayard class, Vauban and Duguesclin adopted composite steel and iron construction for their hulls.

Vauban was 84.7 m (277 ft 11 in) long overall, with a beam of 17.45 m (57 ft) and a draft of 7.39 m (24 ft 3 in). She displaced 6,207.6 t (6,109.6 long tons; 6,842.7 short tons). The crew numbered 24 officers and 450 enlisted men. The ship had a fairly minimal superstructure that consisted of a small conning tower. As was typical for French ironclads of the period, her hull featured a pronounced tumblehome shape and a ram bow.

Her propulsion machinery consisted of two compound steam engines that drove a pair of screw propellers, with steam provided by eight coal-burning fire-tube boilers that were vented through a single funnel. Her engines were rated to produce 4,000 indicated horsepower (3,000 kW) for a top speed of 14 knots (26 km/h; 16 mph). On steam trials, Vauban reached 14.3 knots (26.5 km/h; 16.5 mph) using forced draft. She had a coal storage capacity of 450 t (440 long tons; 500 short tons), which permitted her a cruising radius of 2,380 nautical miles (4,410 km; 2,740 mi) at a speed of 12.8 knots (23.7 km/h; 14.7 mph). To supplement the steam engines, she was fitted with a brig sail rig with a total area of 2,160 m^{2} (23,200 sq ft).

Her main battery consisted of four 240 mm (9.4 in) M1870, 19-caliber guns mounted in individual barbette mounts, two forward placed abreast, and two aft, both of the latter on the centerline. She carried a 194 mm (7.6 in) 19,8-cal. M1870 gun in the bow as a chase gun. These guns were supported by a secondary battery of six 138.6 mm (5.46 in) 21.3-cal. M1870 guns carried in a central battery located amidships in the hull, three guns per broadside. For defense against torpedo boats, she carried twelve 37 mm (1.5 in) 1-pounder Hotchkiss revolver cannon, all in individual mounts. Her armament was rounded out with two 356 mm (14 in) torpedo tubes in above-water launchers forward of the central battery. She also carried a pair of 65 mm (2.6 in) field guns that could be sent ashore with a landing party.

The ship was protected with wrought iron armor; her belt was 150 to 250 mm (5.9 to 9.8 in) thick and extended for the entire length of the hull. The barbettes for the main battery were 200 mm (7.9 in) thick, and her main deck was 50 mm (2 in) thick. Her conning tower received 30 mm (1.2 in) of armor plating.

=== Modifications ===
Vauban underwent a series of modifications during her career. A secondary conning position for an admiral and his staff was added in 1890, which received 25 mm (1 in) of iron plating on the sides. She received new boilers in 1896–1897. By 1898, her armament had been revised somewhat; the 240 mm and 194 mm guns remained unchanged, but an additional pair of 138.6 mm guns were added to the central battery. Six 47 mm (1.9 in) M1885 quick-firing guns were added to the anti-torpedo boat battery.

== Service history ==
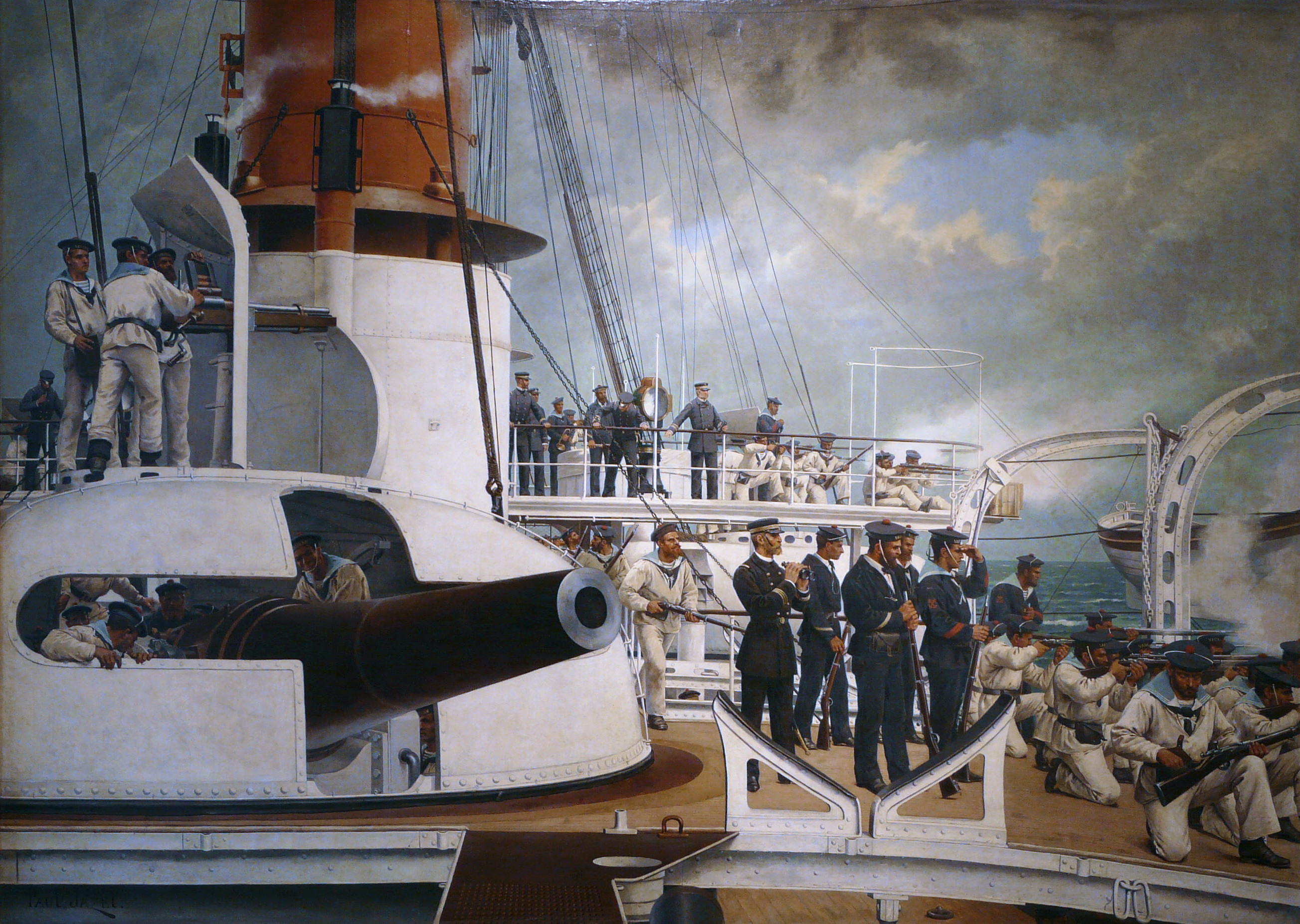
One of the main battery guns during battle practice

Vauban was built in the Arsenal of Cherbourg, and her keel was laid down on 1 August 1877, and she was launched on 3 July 1882. Fitting-out work followed, including the installation of her propulsion machinery between 20 October 1882 and 7 April 1884. She was commissioned in March 1885 to begin sea trials, which lasted into April, though she was not placed in full commission for active service until 9 March 1886. Six days later, she departed for Toulon, to take part in the annual large-scale fleet maneuvers with the Mediterranean Squadron that were held off Toulon from 10 to 17 May. The exercises were used to test the effectiveness of torpedo boats in defending the coastline from a squadron of ironclads, whether cruisers and torpedo boats could break through a blockade of ironclads, and whether a flotilla of torpedo boats could intercept ironclads at sea. In June, she crossed the Mediterranean to visit Ajaccio in Corsica and Mers-el Kebir in French Algeria.

On 8 June 1887, Vauban was assigned to the Naval Division of the Levant, where she served for the next five years. She was based in Piraeus, Greece, where she was the station ship. During this period, the unit was enlarged and renamed the Eastern Mediterranean and Levant Squadron, and Vauban frequently returned home for training exercises. By 1889, the unit also included the cruiser seignelay, the aviso Pétrel, and the gunboat Météore. In 1889, Vauban served in the 3rd Division of the Mediterranean Squadron as the flagship of Rear Admiral O'Neill, along with her sister ship Duguesclin and the ironclad Bayard. She took part in the annual fleet maneuvers that year in company with her division-mates and six other ironclads, along with numerous smaller craft. Vauban served as part of the simulated enemy force during the maneuvers, which lasted from 30 June to 6 July.

During the 1890 fleet maneuvers, the ship was transferred to the 4th Division of the 2nd Squadron of the Mediterranean Fleet, along with Duguesclin and Bayard. The ships concentrated off Oran, French Algeria, on 22 June and then proceeded to Brest, France, arriving there on 2 July for combined operations with the ships of the Northern Squadron. The exercises began four days later and concluded on 25 July, after which Amiral Duperré and the rest of the Mediterranean Fleet returned to Toulon. During the maneuvers, a number of French ships suffered machinery problems, including Vauban, which had ball bearings in her propulsion system become overheated, forcing her to temporarily withdraw from operations. During the fleet maneuvers of 1891, which began on 23 June, Vauban served in the 3rd Division, once again with Duguesclin and Bayard. The maneuvers lasted until 11 July, during which the 3rd Division operated as part of the "French" fleet, opposing a simulated hostile force that attempted to attack the southern French coast.

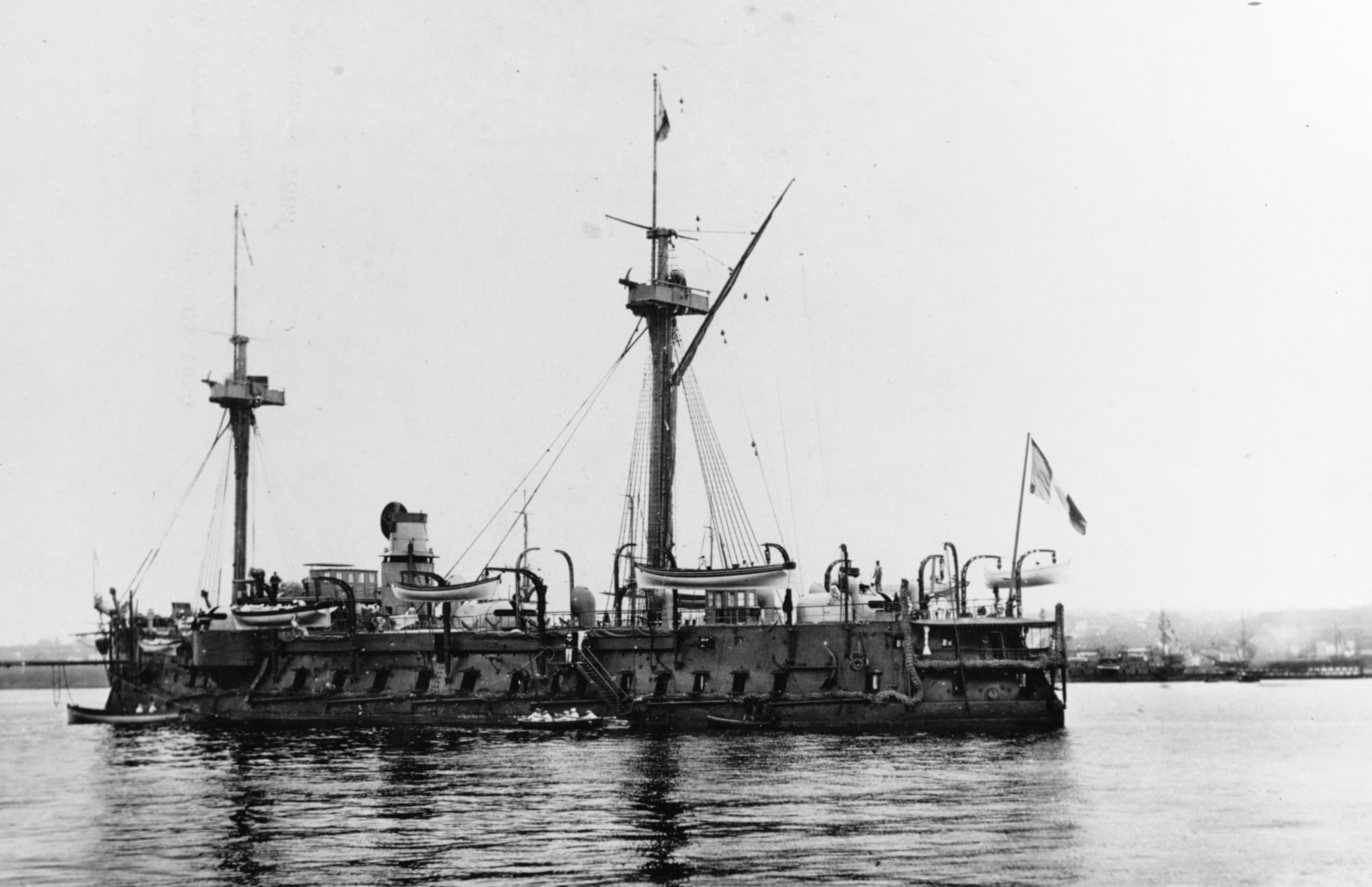
Vauban in port, date unknown

On 26 August 1892, Vauban was withdrawn from the Squadron of the Eastern Mediterranean and the Levant. By 1893, Vauban had been reduced to the Reserve Division of the Mediterranean Squadron, where she and Dueguesclin were rated as armored cruisers. While in reserve, the ships were kept in commission with full crews for six months of the year to take part in training exercises. From 2 August 1894 to 5 February 1895, Vauban served as a support vessel for the old ironclad Couronne, which was at that time serving as a gunnery training ship. By 1895, the two Vauban-class ironclads had been removed from the Reserve Division altogether, and were no longer kept in service, their place having been taken by new, purpose-built armored cruisers. They were reduced to the 2nd category of reserve, along with several old coastal defense ships and unprotected cruisers. The ships were retained in a state that allowed them to be mobilized in the event of a major war. During this period, beginning on 8 April 1896, the ship received new boilers, which were first tested on 29 March 1897.

=== Deployment to East Asia ===
In January 1898, Vauban was recommissioned for service abroad, finally serving in the role for which she was built. She was deployed to French Indochina, along with the unprotected cruiser Duguay-Trouin and the protected cruisers Descartes and Pascal. Vauban served as the flagship of the unit, and remained there for just a year before she was replaced by the new protected cruiser D'Entrecasteaux in early 1899. Vauban was then stationed in Saigon, French Indochina, on 19 May 1899, where she would remain for the next six years. As the Boxer Uprising in Qing China worsened in 1900, French naval activities in the region increased and the unit was reinforced with the ironclad Redoutable and the protected cruiser Guichen. While cruising off Nagasaki, Japan, in September 1900, Vauban suffered an accidental shell explosion in her forward magazine, wounding five men. After the rebellion was suppressed, the Navy determined Vauban was no longer a useful warship and removed her from the 1902 budget estimates.

She was nevertheless retained in reserve in Saigon, French Indochina in 1903, along with Redoutable and three gunboats. The ships remained in reserve in Saigon in 1904, out of commission along with six old gunboats. The ship was struck from the naval register on 12 September 1905, she remained in the navy's inventory for some time. She served as a depot ship for the 2nd Flotilla of torpedo boats based in Hongay, French Indochina, from 1905 to 1910, when she became the depot vessel for submarines based in Saigon, a role she filled until 1914. During the latter period, from 1910 to 1911, she was briefly stationed at Rach-Dua. Vauban was struck from the list of subsidiary vessels on 21 May 1914, but she lingered on for another five years before a request to sell the vessel was submitted on 5 September 1919. The naval ministry approved the sale on 9 October, and she was subsequently broken up.
