= French ironclad Duguesclin =

Ironclad warship of the French Navy

- Duguesclin in port, date unknown

History

France
- Name: Duguesclin
- Builder: Rochefort
- Laid down: March 1877
- Launched: 7 April 1883
- Commissioned: 1 January 1886
- Decommissioned: 1 September 1903
- Stricken: 19 October 1904
- Fate: Broken up, 1905

General characteristics
- Class & type: Vauban-class ironclad
- Displacement: 6,207.6 t (6,109.6 long tons; 6,842.7 short tons)
- Length: 84.7 m (277 ft 11 in) loa
- Beam: 17.45 m (57 ft)
- Draft: 7.39 m (24 ft 3 in)
- Installed power: 8 × fire-tube boilers; 4,000 indicated horsepower (3,000 kW)
- Propulsion: 2 × compound steam engines; 2 × screw propellers
- Speed: 14 kn (26 km/h; 16 mph)
- Range: 2,380.5 nmi (4,408.7 km; 2,739.4 mi) at 12.8 knots (23.7 km/h; 14.7 mph)
- Crew: 24 officers; 450 enlisted men
- Armament: 4 × 240 mm (9.4 in) guns; 1 × 194 mm (7.6 in) gun; 6 × 138.6 mm (5.46 in) guns; 12 × 37 mm (1.5 in) Hotchkiss revolver cannon; 2 × 356 mm (14 in) torpedo tubes
- Armor: Belt: 150 to 250 mm (5.9 to 9.8 in); Barbettes: 200 mm (7.9 in); Deck: 50 mm (2 in); Conning tower: 30 mm (1.2 in)

Duguesclin was an ironclad barbette ship built for the French Navy in the late 1870s and 1880s; she was the second and final member of the Vauban class. Intended for service in the French colonial empire, she was designed as a "station ironclad", which were smaller versions of the first-rate vessels built for the main fleet. The Vauban class was a scaled down variant of Amiral Duperré. They carried their main battery of four 240 mm (9.4 in) guns in open barbettes, two forward side-by-side and the other two aft on the centerline. Duguesclin was laid down in 1879 and was completed in 1885. Despite the intention to use her overseas, the ship remained in home waters for the duration of her career, serving with the Mediterranean Squadron from 1888 to 1895, though the last two years were as part of the Reserve Division. She spent the next several years in the 2nd category of reserve, ultimately being struck from the naval register in 1904. She was sold for scrap the following year and broken up in Italy.

== Design ==
Profile, upper deck, and battery deck drawing of the Vauban class

The Vauban class of barbette ships was designed in the late 1870s as part of a naval construction program that began under the post-Franco-Prussian War fleet plan of 1872. At the time, the French Navy categorized its capital ships as high-seas ships for the main fleet, station ironclads for use in the French colonial empire, and smaller coastal defense ships. The Vauban class was intended to serve in the second role, and they were based on the high-seas ironclad Amiral Duperré, albeit a scaled-down version. Unlike their wooden-hulled predecessors of the Bayard class, Duguesclin and Vauban adopted composite steel and iron construction for their hulls.

Duguesclin was 84.7 m (277 ft 11 in) long overall, with a beam of 17.45 m (57 ft) and a draft of 7.39 m (24 ft 3 in). She displaced 6,207.6 t (6,109.6 long tons; 6,842.7 short tons). The crew numbered 24 officers and 450 enlisted men. The ship had a fairly minimal superstructure that consisted of a small conning tower. As was typical for French ironclads of the period, her hull featured a pronounced tumblehome shape and a ram bow.

Her propulsion machinery consisted of two compound steam engines that drove a pair of screw propellers, with steam provided by eight coal-burning fire-tube boilers that were vented through a single funnel. Her engines were rated to produce 4,000 indicated horsepower (3,000 kW) for a top speed of 14 knots (26 km/h; 16 mph). She had a coal storage capacity of 450 t (440 long tons; 500 short tons), which permitted her a cruising radius of 2,380 nautical miles (4,410 km; 2,740 mi) at a speed of 12.8 knots (23.7 km/h; 14.7 mph). To supplement the steam engines, she was fitted with a brig sail rig with a total area of 2,160 m^{2} (23,200 sq ft).

Her main battery consisted of four 240 mm (9.4 in) M1870, 19-caliber guns mounted in individual barbette mounts, two forward placed abreast, and two aft, both of the latter on the centerline. She carried a 194 mm (7.6 in) 19,8-cal. M1870 gun in the bow as a chase gun. These guns were supported by a secondary battery of six 138.6 mm (5.46 in) 21.3-cal. M1870 guns carried in a central battery located amidships in the hull, three guns per broadside. For defense against torpedo boats, she carried twelve 37 mm (1.5 in) 1-pounder Hotchkiss revolver cannon, all in individual mounts. Her armament was rounded out with two 356 mm (14 in) torpedo tubes in above-water launchers forward of the central battery. She also carried a pair of 65 mm (2.6 in) field guns that could be sent ashore with a landing party. In 1889, the ship received a pair of 47 mm (1.9 in) guns in place of two of the 37 mm guns, and by 1893, a further four of the 47 mm guns were added.

The ship was protected with wrought iron armor; her belt was 150 to 250 mm (5.9 to 9.8 in) thick and extended for the entire length of the hull. The barbettes for the main battery were 200 mm (7.9 in) thick, and her main deck was 50 mm (2 in) thick. Her conning tower received 30 mm (1.2 in) of armor plating.

== Service history ==
Duguesclin as originally built

The keel for Duguesclin was laid down at the Arsenal de Rochefort in March 1877, and she was launched on 7 April 1883. Installation of her propulsion machinery followed, beginning in May and lasting until 8 September 1884. She was commissioned on 1 January 1886 to begin sea trials, which lasted for several months. On 10 April, she moved to Brest for further trials, arriving there three days later. Her initial testing lasted through June, and on 28 July, she was placed in reserve for repairs to her hull. Duguesclin was recommissioned on 27 April 1887 for another round of trials, and on 7 July she was placed back in reserve. The ship then moved to Toulon with a reduced crew on 13 February 1888, where she was allocated to the 2nd category of reserve.

Duguesclin was activated on 23 August 1888 for the annual fleet maneuvers. She got underway two days later to join the rest of the fleet, which had assembled at Hyères by 30 August. The maneuvers ended on 4 September, with the fleet returning to Toulon by the 10th. On 20 March 1889, Duguesclin was placed in full commission for active service for the first time, to be assigned to the Eastern Mediterranean and Levant Squadron. She joined the unit three days later, and remained active with it through 1892. During this period, the ship routinely returned to French waters to take part in annual training exercises with the rest of the fleet. Duguesclin served in the 3rd Division of the Mediterranean Squadron in 1890, along with her sister ship Vauban and the ironclad Bayard. She took part in the annual fleet maneuvers that year in company with her division-mates and six other ironclads, along with numerous smaller craft. Duguesclin served as part of the simulated enemy force during the maneuvers, which lasted from 30 June to 6 July.

During the 1890 fleet maneuvers, the ship was transferred to the 4th Division of the 2nd Squadron of the Mediterranean Fleet, along with Duguesclin and Bayard. The ships concentrated off Oran, French Algeria on 22 June and then proceeded to Brest, arriving there on 2 July for combined operations with the ships of the Northern Squadron. The exercises began four days later and concluded on 25 July, after which Duguesclin and the rest of the Mediterranean Fleet returned to Toulon. During the fleet maneuvers of 1891, which began on 23 June, Duguesclin served in the 3rd Division, once again with Vauban and Bayard. The maneuvers lasted until 11 July, during which the 3rd Division operated as part of the "French" fleet, opposing a simulated hostile force that attempted to attack the southern French coast.

On 1 January 1893, Duguesclin left the Eastern Mediterranean and Levant Squadron, and she was allocated to the 2nd category of reserve on 9 February. At that time, she and Vauban were rated as armored cruisers. While in reserve, the ships were kept in commission with full crews for six months of the year to take part in training exercises. On 25 October 1894, she was reduced to the 3rd category of reserve, by which time she no longer saw active service. By that time, the two Vauban-class ironclads had been replaced by new, purpose-built armored cruisers. They were retained in a state that allowed them to be mobilized in the event of a major war. The French Navy had reconstructed several ironclads in the 1890s, but in 1899, decided against allocating funds to modernize Duguesclin. She was instead decommissioned on 1 September 1903 and struck from the naval register on 10 October 1904, before being sold to the Italian ship breaking firm M. Cerrutti of Genoa on 3 August 1905; she was subsequently taken there to be dismantled. Despite having been designed and built to serve in the French colonies, Duguesclin never deployed overseas.
