= French ship Turenne =

Two ships of the French Navy have borne the name Turenne in honour of French military commander Henri de la Tour d'Auvergne, Vicomte de Turenne:

- Turenne (1854), a 100-gun ship of the line
- Turenne, a Bayard-class ironclad
