= French ship Vauban =

At least two ships of the French Navy have borne the name Vauban:

- French ironclad Vauban, lead ship of the Vauban-class ironclad launched in 1882 and stricken in 1905
- French destroyer Vauban, a Guépard-class destroyer launched in 1930 and scuttled in 1942
