= French ship Duguesclin =

At least three French Navy ships have borne the name Duguesclin in honour of Bertrand du Guesclin:

- Duguesclin (1807), a Téméraire-class 74-gun ship of the line
- Duguesclin (1848), a 90-gun Suffren-class ship of the line
- Duguesclin (1883), a Vauban-class station ironclad (cuirassé de station) with barbettes
