= French ironclad Bayard =

Ironclad warship of the French Navy

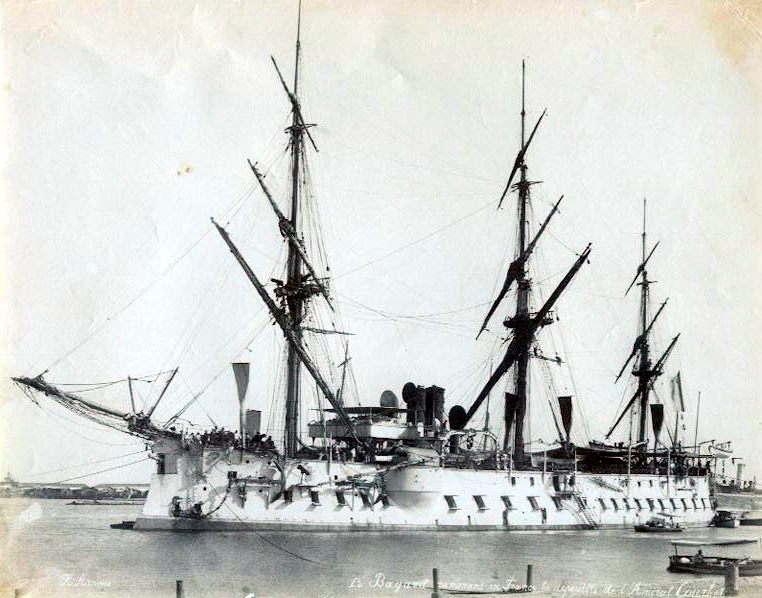
- Bayard crossing the Suez Canal at Port Said while bringing the remains of Admiral Amédée Courbet back to France. Her spars are set diagonally, one mast perpendicular to another, as a sign of mourning.

History

France
- Name: Bayard
- Namesake: Pierre Terrail, seigneur de Bayard
- Builder: Brest
- Laid down: 19 September 1876
- Launched: 27 March 1880
- Commissioned: November 1882 in Brest
- In service: May 1883
- Stricken: 26 April 1899
- Fate: Broken up in 1910

General characteristics
- Class & type: Bayard-class ironclad
- Displacement: 6,363 t (6,263 long tons; 7,014 short tons)
- Length: 81.22 m (266 ft 6 in) lwl
- Beam: 17.45 m (57 ft)
- Draft: 7.49 m (24 ft 7 in)
- Installed power: 8 × fire-tube boilers; 4,000 ihp (3,000 kW)
- Propulsion: 2 × compound steam engines; 2 × screw propellers
- Sail plan: Full-ship rig
- Speed: 14 knots (26 km/h; 16 mph)
- Crew: 24 officers; 425 enlisted men
- Armament: 4 × 240 mm (9.4 in) guns; 2 × 194 mm (7.6 in) guns; 6 × 138.6 mm (5.46 in) guns; 4 × 47 mm (1.9 in) Hotchkiss revolver cannon; 12 × 37 mm (1.5 in) Hotchkiss revolver cannon; 2 × 356 mm (14 in) torpedo tubes
- Armor: Belt: 150 to 250 mm (5.9 to 9.8 in); Barbettes: 200 mm (7.9 in); Deck: 50 mm (2 in)

Bayard was the lead ship of the Bayard class of ironclad barbette ships built for the French Navy in the late 1870s and 1880s. Intended for service in the French colonial empire, she was designed as a "station ironclad", smaller versions of the first-rate vessels built for the main fleet. The Vauban class was a scaled-down variant of Amiral Duperré. They carried their main battery of four 240 mm (9.4 in) guns in open barbettes, two forward side-by-side and the other two aft on the centerline. Bayard was laid down in 1876 and was commissioned in 1882.

== Design ==
The Bayard class of barbette ships was designed in the late 1870s as part of a naval construction program that began under the post-Franco-Prussian War fleet plan of 1872. At the time, the French Navy categorized its capital ships as high-seas ships for the main fleet, station ironclads for use in the French colonial empire, and smaller coastal defense ships. The Bayard class was intended to serve in the second role, and they were based on the high-seas ironclad Amiral Duperré, albeit a scaled-down version.

Bayard was 81.22 m (266 ft 6 in) long at the waterline, with a beam of 17.45 m (57 ft) and a draft of 7.49 m (24 ft 7 in). She displaced 6,363 t (6,263 long tons; 7,014 short tons). The crew numbered 20 officers and 430 enlisted men. Her propulsion machinery consisted of two compound steam engines driving a pair of screw propellers, with steam provided by eight coal-burning fire-tube boilers. Her engines were rated to produce 4,000 indicated horsepower (3,000 kW) for a top speed of 14 knots (26 km/h; 16 mph). To supplement the steam engines on long voyages overseas, she was fitted with a full-ship rig.

Her main battery consisted of four 240 mm (9.4 in) M1870, 19-caliber guns mounted in individual barbette mounts, two forward placed abreast and two aft, both on the centerline. She carried a pair of 194 mm (7.6 in) guns, one in the bow and one in the stern as chase guns. These guns were supported by a secondary battery of six 138.6 mm (5.46 in) guns carried in a central battery located amidships in the hull, three guns per broadside. For defense against torpedo boats, she carried four 47 mm (1.9 in) 3-pounder Hotchkiss revolver cannon and twelve 37 mm (1.5 in) 1-pounder Hotchkiss revolvers, all in individual mounts. Her armament was rounded out by a pair of 356 mm (14 in) torpedo tubes in above-water mounts. The ship was protected with wrought iron armor; her belt was 150 to 250 mm (5.9 to 9.8 in) thick and extended for the entire length of the hull. The barbettes for the main battery were 200 mm (7.9 in) thick, and her main deck was 50 mm (2 in) thick.

== Service history ==
The keel for Bayard was laid down on 19 September 1876, and her completed hull was launched on 27 March 1880. Fitting out work was completed in 1882, and the ship was commissioned on 22 November 1882 to begin sea trials. She was then placed in reserve. Bayard was recommissioned in May 1883 under the command of capitaine de vaisseau Parrayon as the flagship of Admiral Amédée Courbet, who had recently been appointed to the command of France's Trial Division (division des essais), established in April 1883. On 31 May 1883, in the wake of the defeat and death of Commandant Henri Rivière in Tonkin (northern Vietnam) at the Battle of Paper Bridge, Courbet was placed in command of a newly created Tonkin Coasts naval division. In early June Courbet left for the Far East with the ironclads Bayard and Atalante and the screw corvette Châteaurenault.

=== Tonkin campaign and the Sino-French War ===
Bayard arrived in Ha Long Bay on 10 July, and for the next eleven months served as flagship of the Tonkin Coasts naval division. In August 1883, in the Battle of Thuận An, she bombarded the coastal defences of Hué, receiving minor shot damage from the Vietnamese shore batteries. From October 1883 to June 1884, during the period of growing tension that preceded the outbreak of the Sino-French War (August 1884–April 1885), she took part in a French naval blockade of the coast of Tonkin. On 30 November 1883, in response to the threat of an imminent Vietnamese attack on the French post at Quảng Yên, Bayard's landing company was hastily installed in the town's citadel, successfully deterring the threatened attack. In June 1884 Bayard became the flagship of the Far East Squadron, an exceptional naval grouping created for the war with China by the amalgamation of the Tonkin Coasts and Far East naval divisions.

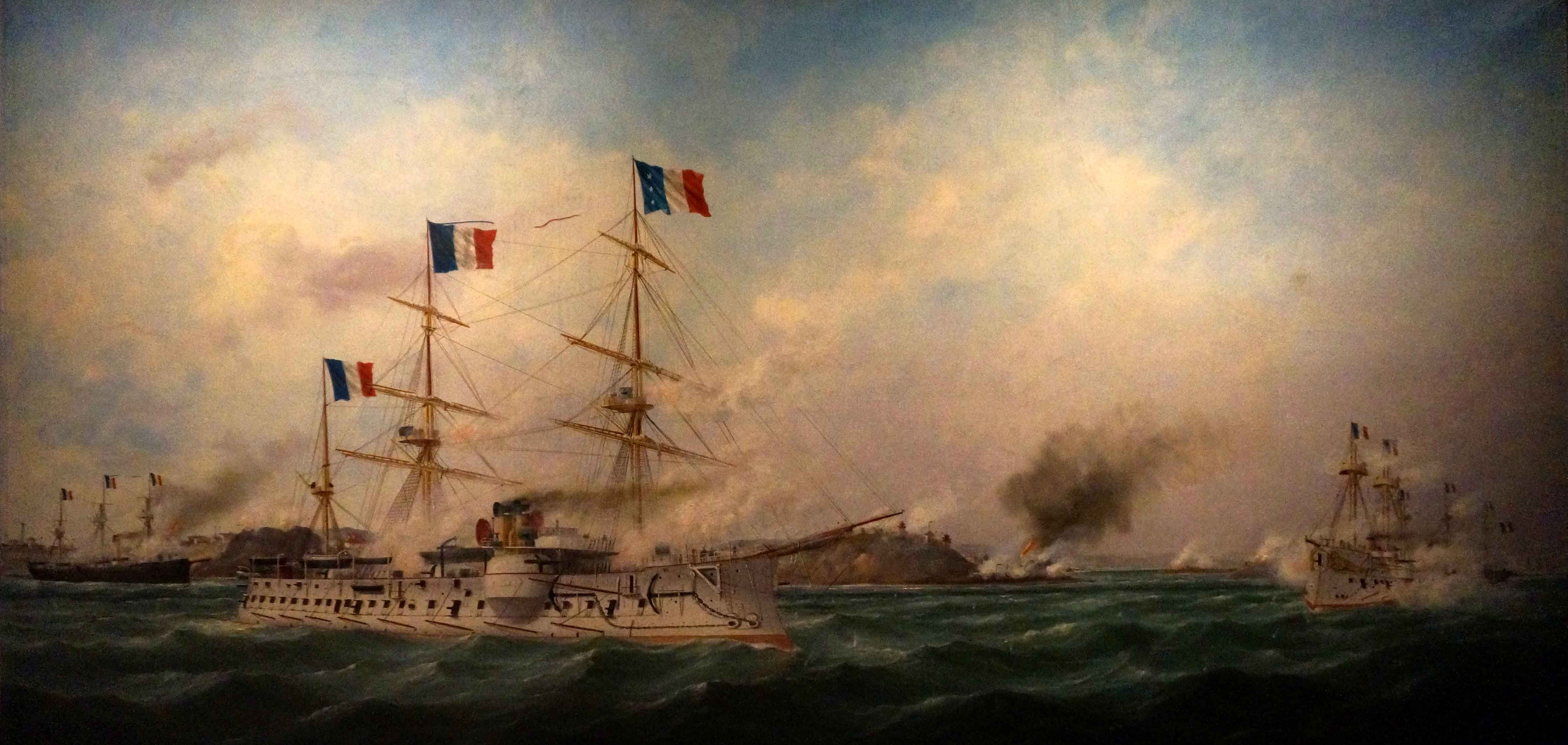
Bayard during the Pescadores campaign in 1885

On 5 August 1884 sailors from Bayard took part in a French landing at Keelung, but were forced to re-embark on 6 August by a heavy Chinese counterattack. Bayard took no part in the Battle of Fuzhou (23 August 1884), the opening battle of the Sino-French War, as she drew too much water to enter the Min River. Instead, she was left to guard the telegraph station at Sharp Peak near Matsu that allowed the squadron to communicate with France. On 1 October 1884 Bayard and several other French warships supported the French landing at Keelung with a naval bombardment of Chinese shore positions. On 8 October Bayard's landing company took part in the failed French landing at Tamsui, which condemned the Formosa expeditionary corps to a prolonged Keelung Campaign. From November 1884 to January 1885 Bayard took part in the French naval blockade of Formosa. On 14 November 1884, while anchored off Keelung and exposed to the northeast monsoon, she nearly foundered when her anchor chain snapped during a gale.

In February 1885 five warships of China's Nanyang Fleet made a sortie from Shanghai in an attempt to break the French blockade of Formosa. Courbet sought them out with Bayard and several other ships of the Far East squadron, and trapped them in Shipu Bay. At the Battle of Shipu on the night of 14 February 1885, two of Bayard's launches, used as improvised torpedo boats, attacked the Chinese squadron at anchor and disabled the frigate Yuyuan and the composite sloop Chengqing. In early March 1885, Bayard took part in the French blockade of Zhenhai, the outport of Ningbo. In late March she formed part of the French flotilla for the Pescadores Campaign, and her landing company was engaged ashore on 31 March in the decisive battle with the Chinese defenders of Makung.

Courbet died of cholera on board Bayard in the harbor of Makung, in the Pescadores Islands, on 11 June 1885. Bayard left the Pescadores on 23 June to return Courbet's body to France; by that time, her sister Turenne had arrived to relieve her as the squadron flagship. She passed through Aden on 2 August and reached the Suez Canal eight days later. Bayard thereafter stopped in Bône, French Algeria, where she remained until 22 August. She sailed for Toulon, arriving on 26 August, where a state funeral was held for Courbet. She then proceeded to Brest to be disarmed and decommissioned.

=== Later career ===
By 1888, Bayard had been assigned to the Reserve Division of the Mediterranean Squadron. She was activated on 23 August that year for the annual fleet maneuvers. She got underway two days later to join the rest of the fleet, which had assembled at Hyères by 30 August. The maneuvers ended on 4 September, with the fleet returning to Toulon by the 10th. Beginning in 1889, Bayard served in the Escadre de la Mediterranee occidentale et du Levant (Eastern Mediterranean and Levant Squadron), where she operated through 1892. During this period, she regularly returned to French waters to participate in annual training exercises with the rest of the fleet. Bayard served in the 3rd Division of the Mediterranean Squadron in 1890, along with the two Vauban-class ironclads. She took part in the annual fleet maneuvers that year in company with her division-mates and six other ironclads, along with numerous smaller craft. Bayard served as part of the simulated enemy force during the maneuvers, which lasted from 30 June to 6 July. During the 1890 fleet maneuvers, the ship was transferred to the 4th Division of the 2nd Squadron of the Mediterranean Fleet, along with the two Vaubans and the unprotected cruiser Rigault de Genouilly. The ships concentrated off Oran, French Algeria on 22 June and then proceeded to Brest, France, arriving there on 2 July for combined operations with the ships of the Northern Squadron. The exercises began four days later and concluded on 25 July, after which Bayard and the rest of the Mediterranean Fleet returned to Toulon.

During the fleet maneuvers of 1891, which began on 23 June, Bayard served in the 3rd Division, once again with the two Vauban-class ships. The maneuvers lasted until 11 July, during which the 3rd Division operated as part of the "French" fleet, opposing a simulated hostile force that attempted to attack the southern French coast. In 1893, Bayard was sent on another deployment to French Indochina, where she resumed her old role as flagship of the naval division stationed there. In 1895, the unit also included the old ironclad Triomphante, which was kept in reserve, and four protected cruisers. She remained on the East Asia station through 1896, by which time two of the cruisers had been withdrawn, leaving Isly and Alger. The following year, the unit remained unchanged apart from the substitution of the protected cruiser Descartes for Alger. Bayard remained in French Indochina in 1898. That year, the division had been strengthened to the extent that it now formed a full squadron, and Bayard served as one of the divisional flagships. In July, Bayard and the protected cruiser Pascal visited Manila in the Philippines in the aftermath of the Battle of Manila Bay during the Spanish–American War. They were two of many neutral warships from Germany, Britain, Austria-Hungary, and Japan that stopped in the islands to observe the situation and protect their nationals in the city. They were present to witness the fall of Manila to American forces on 13 August, and Bayard evacuated the wife and children of the Spanish Admiral Patricio Montojo y Pasarón.

The following year, she was replaced by the cruiser D'Entrecasteaux, though Bayard remained in the area as a stationary guard ship. She was moored in Port Courbet (now Hạ Long) as the flagship of the Annam and Tonkin Division, which included the aviso Kersaint and three gunboats. On 26 April 1899, she was struck from the naval register and was converted into a hulk, and was employed in that role until 1904 when she was sold for scrap and broken up in Saigon.
