= French ironclad Turenne =

Ironclad warship of the French Navy

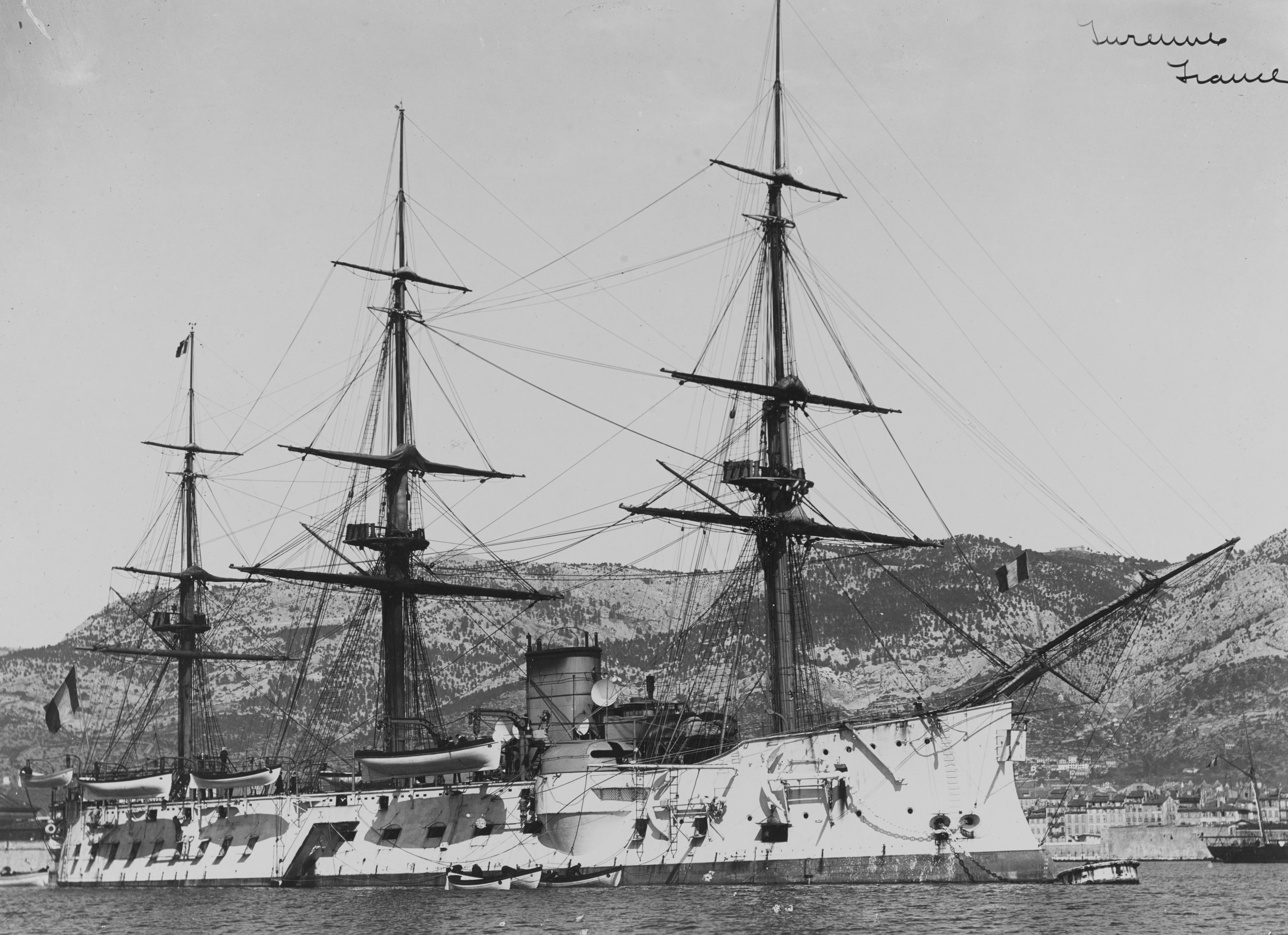
- Turenne in Toulon in March 1890

History

France
- Name: Turenne
- Builder: Lorient
- Laid down: 1 March 1877
- Launched: 16 October 1879
- Completed: 1882
- Commissioned: 4 February 1882
- Stricken: 4 September 1900
- Fate: Sold, 1901

General characteristics
- Class & type: Bayard-class ironclad
- Displacement: 6,363 t (6,263 long tons; 7,014 short tons)
- Length: 81.22 m (266 ft 6 in) lwl
- Beam: 17.45 m (57 ft)
- Draft: 7.49 m (24 ft 7 in)
- Installed power: 8 × fire-tube boilers; 4,000 ihp (3,000 kW)
- Propulsion: 2 × compound steam engines; 2 × screw propellers
- Sail plan: Full-ship rig
- Speed: 14 knots (26 km/h; 16 mph)
- Crew: 24 officers; 425 enlisted men
- Armament: 4 × 240 mm (9.4 in) guns; 2 × 194 mm (7.6 in) guns; 6 × 138.6 mm (5.46 in) guns; 4 × 47 mm (1.9 in) Hotchkiss revolver cannon; 12 × 37 mm (1.5 in) Hotchkiss revolver cannon; 2 × 356 mm (14 in) torpedo tubes
- Armor: Belt: 150 to 250 mm (5.9 to 9.8 in); Barbettes: 200 mm (7.9 in); Deck: 50 mm (2 in)

Turenne was an ironclad barbette ship of the French Navy built in the 1870s and 1880s; she was the second and final member of the Bayard class. Intended for service in the French colonial empire, she was designed as a "station ironclad", which were smaller versions of the first-rate vessels built for the main fleet. The Bayard class was a scaled-down variant of Amiral Duperré. They carried their main battery of four 240 mm (9.4 in) guns in open barbettes, two forward side-by-side and the other two aft on the centerline. Turenne was laid down in 1877 and was commissioned in 1882. She was sent to East Asia in early 1885 during the Sino-French War, but the conflict had ended by the time she arrived in the area. Turenne served as the flagship of the French squadron in the region for the next five years before returning to France in early 1890. The ship saw little active service in home waters, and remained in the reserve fleet for about a decade before being sold for scrap in 1901.

== Design ==
The Bayard class of barbette ships was designed in the late 1870s as part of a naval construction program that began under the post-Franco-Prussian War fleet plan of 1872. At the time, the French Navy categorized its capital ships as high-seas ships for the main fleet, station ironclads for use in the French colonial empire, and smaller coastal defense ships. The Bayard class was intended to serve in the second role, and they were based on the high-seas ironclad Amiral Duperré, albeit a scaled-down version.

Turenne was 81.22 m (266 ft 6 in) long at the waterline, with a beam of 17.45 m (57 ft) and a draft of 7.49 m (24 ft 7 in). She displaced 6,363 t (6,263 long tons; 7,014 short tons). The crew numbered 20 officers and 430 enlisted men. Her propulsion machinery consisted of two compound steam engines driving a pair of screw propellers, with steam provided by eight coal-burning fire-tube boilers. Her engines were rated to produce 4,000 indicated horsepower (3,000 kW) for a top speed of 14 knots (26 km/h; 16 mph). To supplement the steam engines on long voyages overseas, she was fitted with a full-ship rig.

Her main battery consisted of four 240 mm (9.4 in) M1870, 19-caliber guns mounted in individual barbette mounts, two forward placed abreast and two aft, both on the centerline. She carried a pair of 194 mm (7.6 in) guns, one in the bow and one in the stern as chase guns. These guns were supported by a secondary battery of six 138.6 mm (5.46 in) guns carried in a central battery located amidships in the hull, three guns per broadside. For defense against torpedo boats, she carried four 47 mm (1.9 in) 3-pounder Hotchkiss revolver cannon and twelve 37 mm (1.5 in) 1-pounder Hotchkiss revolvers, all in individual mounts. Her armament was rounded out by a pair of 356 mm (14 in) torpedo tubes in above-water mounts. The ship was protected with wrought iron armor; her belt was 150 to 250 mm (5.9 to 9.8 in) thick and extended for the entire length of the hull. The barbettes for the main battery were 200 mm (7.9 in) thick, and her main deck was 50 mm (2 in) thick.

== Service history ==
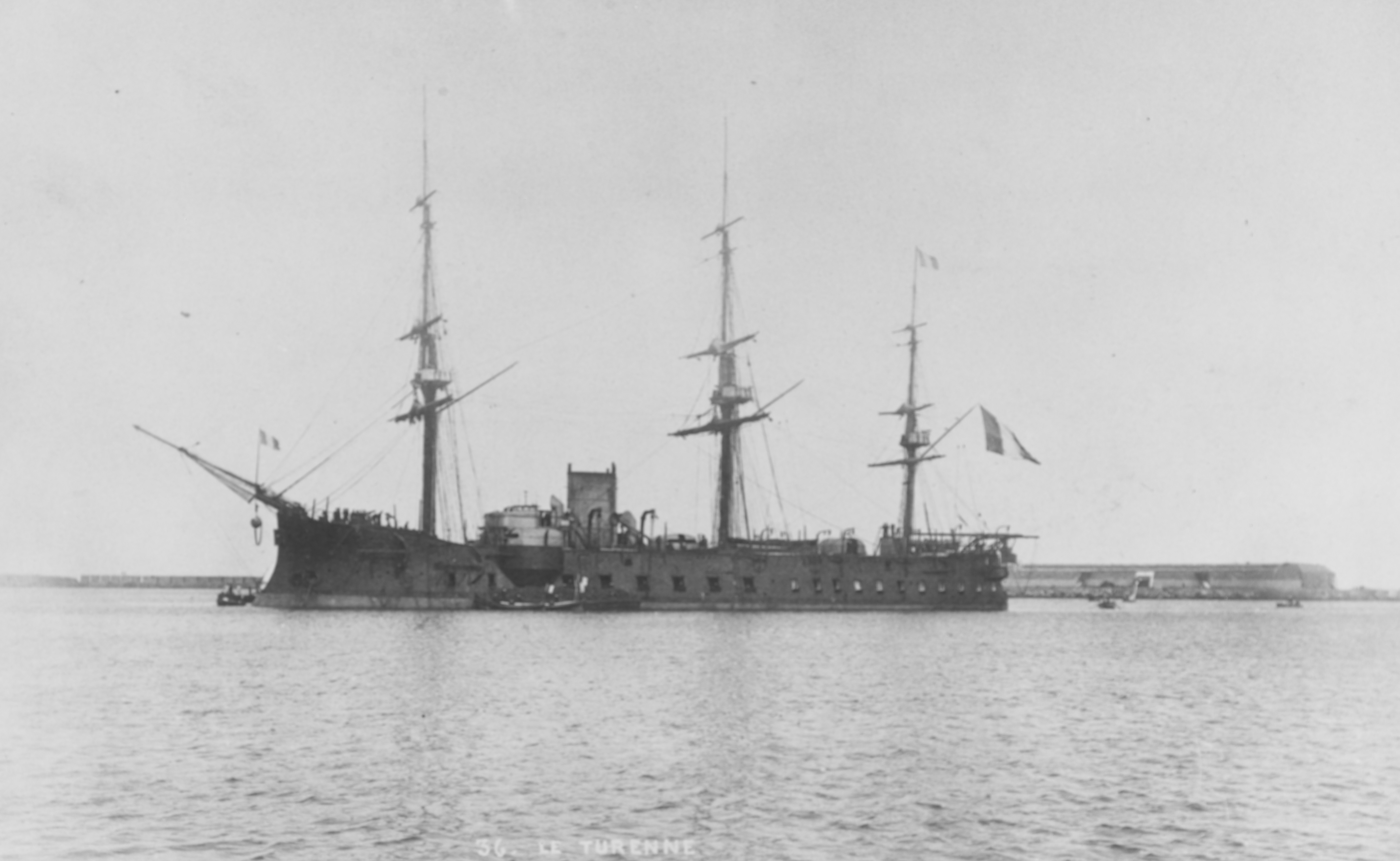
Turenne, date unknown; the photo was likely taken while she was in Algiers in March 1885.

Construction of Turenne began with her keel laying on 1 March 1877 in Lorient; her completed hull was launched on 16 October 1879, and fitting out work was completed in 1881, when she began sea trials that continued into the following year. She was commissioned on 4 February 1882. She was thereafter placed in reserve, remaining there for the next two years. The ship was recommissioned for active service in 1884. On 16 February 1884, Turenne was involved in experiments with marine gyroscopes at Brest.

The ship was deployed overseas in 1885 to join the Escadre de l'Extrême-Orient (Far East Squadron) to reinforce the unit during the Sino-French War. The unprotected cruisers Magon, Roland, Primauguet, Limier, and Hugon, and several gunboats and smaller craft were sent along with Turenne. She departed Brest on 21 February and stopped in Algiers, French Algeria, on 3 March while en route. By 25 April, she had arrived on station in French Indochina, though a preliminary peace agreement had already been signed on 4 April, so Turenne saw no action during the war. Over the course of the ship's tour abroad over the next five years, she cruised extensively through East Asia, visiting numerous foreign ports, and served as the flagship of the squadron.

By 1889, the unit consisted of Turenne, the flagship, the old unprotected cruiser Villars, the aviso Chasseur, and the gunboats Vipère and Aspic. Turenne embarked on her final such tour on 14 August 1889 in company with Vipère, stopping in Chefoo, China, and then Nagasaki, Japan, by 13 September. On 14 November, she visited Kobe, Japan, before returning to Chinese waters. Turenne met Chasseur in Hong Kong on 9 December. Five days later, the two ships departed to return to French Indochina, stopping first in Along Bay on 17 December and then proceeding to Saigon on 4 January 1890. They arrived there four days later and immediately began preparations for Turenne to return to France. She departed on 30 January, stopping in Singapore, Colombo, and Aden on the way. She reached the Suez Canal on 2 March, and after entering the Mediterranean Sea, stopped in Toulon, France, on 13 March. After staying there a week, she left for Cherbourg. She thereafter was placed in the second category of reserve, where she spent the next five years.

The ship took part in a training exercise for naval reservists in mid-1891; around 3,700 men were called up to take part in familiarization training and Turenne was activated to participate, along with the coastal defense ships Vengeur, Tonnerre, and Tonnant. They did not participate in formal maneuvers, and each vessel went to sea individually to train their crews. Turenne was placed in commission for special service in 1894, along with the unprotected cruiser Éclaireur, the aviso Voltigeur, and the gunboat Lèzard. In 1896, the contemporary journal The Naval Annual noted that the ship, along with the other station ironclads still in the French inventory, was "practically condemned" and would "shortly be struck off the list". She nevertheless remained in the navy's inventory as part of the second category of reserve, along with several old coastal defense ships and unprotected cruisers. They were retained in a state that allowed them to be mobilized in the event of a major war. The French government struck a number of old vessels from the naval estimates beginning in 1899, removing funding allocated to keep them up. Turenne was struck from the naval register on 4 September 1900 and she was later placed for sale at Cherbourg in 1901.
