= Bayard-class ironclad =

1880 class of French armored cruisers

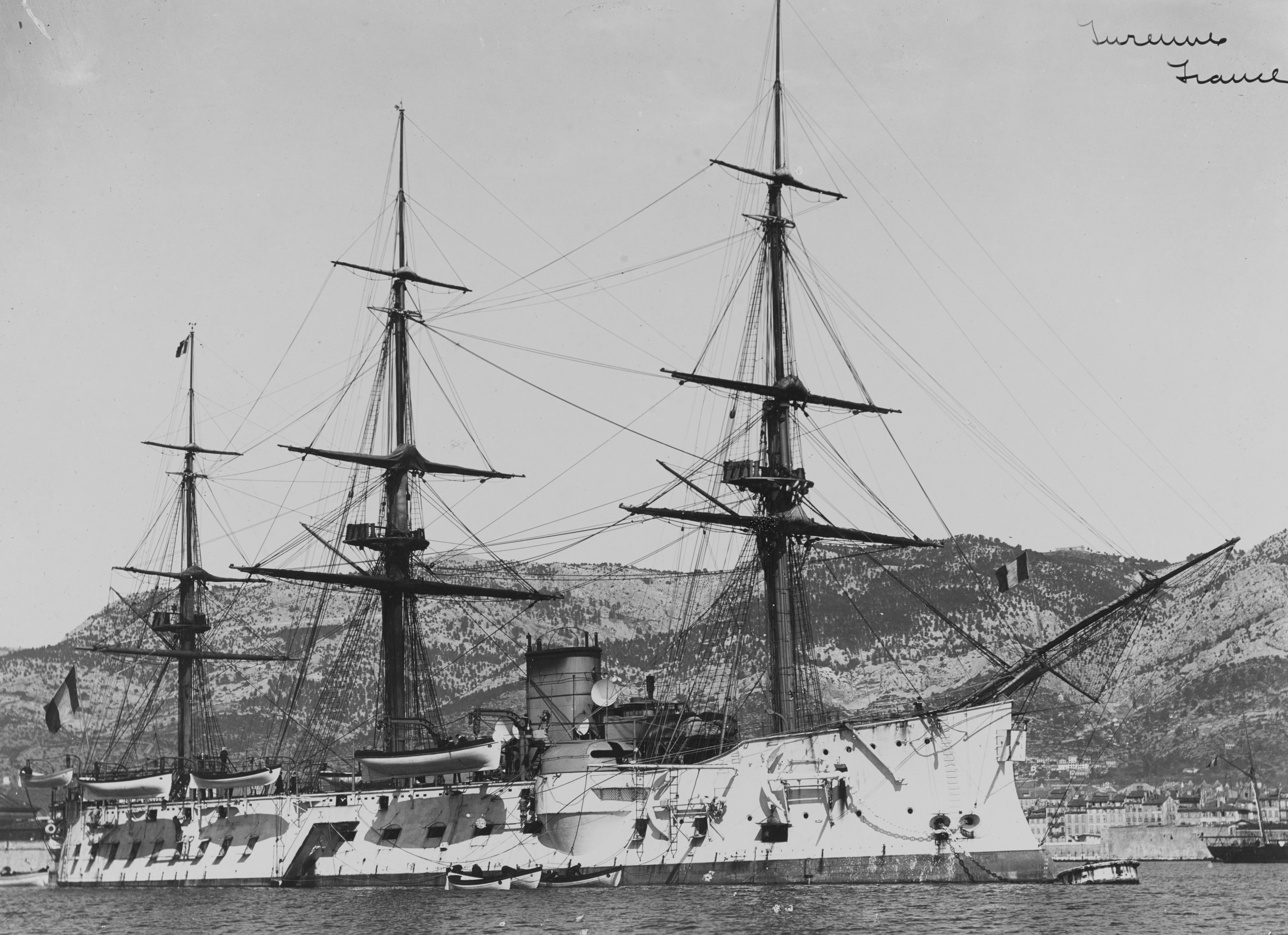
- Turenne in Toulon, March 1890

Class overview
- Builders: Arsenal de Brest; Arsenal de Lorient
- Operators: French Navy
- Preceded by: Amiral Duperré
- Succeeded by: Vauban class
- Built: 1876–1882
- In commission: 1882–1899
- Completed: 2
- Scrapped: 2

General characteristics
- Type: ironclad warship
- Displacement: 6,363 t (6,263 long tons; 7,014 short tons)
- Length: 81.22 m (266 ft 6 in) lwl
- Beam: 17.45 m (57 ft)
- Draft: 7.49 m (24 ft 7 in)
- Installed power: 8 × fire-tube boilers; 4,000 ihp (3,000 kW)
- Propulsion: 2 × compound steam engines; 2 × screw propellers
- Sail plan: Full-ship rig
- Speed: 14 knots (26 km/h; 16 mph)
- Crew: 24 officers; 425 enlisted men
- Armament: 4 × 240 mm (9.4 in) guns; 2 × 194 mm (7.6 in) guns; 6 × 138.6 mm (5.46 in) guns; 4 × 47 mm (1.9 in) Hotchkiss revolver cannon; 12 × 37 mm (1.5 in) Hotchkiss revolver cannon; 2 × 356 mm (14 in) torpedo tubes
- Armor: Belt: 150 to 250 mm (5.9 to 9.8 in); Barbettes: 200 mm (7.9 in); Deck: 50 mm (2 in)

The Bayard class was a pair of two ironclad warships built for the French Navy in the late 1870s and early 1880s. The class comprised two ships: Bayard and Turenne. The class is sometimes referred to as the Turenne class. They were based on the ironclad Amiral Duperré, adopting the same general arrangement, but were scaled down in size. They were intended for use overseas in the French colonial empire, and as such, they retained a sailing rig for long-range cruising and copper sheathing for their hulls to protect them when they would be unable to be dry-docked regularly. They carried a main battery of four 240 mm (9.4 in) guns that were mounted in individual barbettes; two were in sponsons forward, abreast of the conning tower, and the other two were on the centerline aft.

Turenne was laid up upon completion in 1882, while Bayard was sent to East Asian waters, where she served much of her career as a flagship. She saw action during the Tonkin campaign that established France's colonial empire in what became French Indochina, as well as the Sino-French War that immediately followed. After Vice Admiral Amédée Courbet died in 1885, Bayard carried his remains back to France. Turenne replaced her as the flagship in East Asia, but she had a much less eventful stint in the region, remaining there until 1889, when she returned to France to be placed in reserve once more in 1890. Bayard returned to Indochina in 1893, and she remained there until being decommissioned in 1899 and reduced to a storage hulk, a role she filled until 1904. By that time, Turenne had been sold for scrapping in 1901, and Bayard followed her to the breakers' yard in 1904.

== Design ==
The Bayard class, also referred to as the Turenne class, of barbette ships was designed in the late 1870s as part of a naval construction program that began under the post-Franco-Prussian War fleet plan of 1872. At the time, the French Navy categorized its capital ships as high-seas ships for the main fleet, station ironclads for use in the French colonial empire, and smaller coastal defense ships. The Bayard class was intended to serve in the second role. The naval architect Victorin Sabattier submitted a proposal to build a scaled-down version of his high-seas ironclad Amiral Duperré to meet requirements issued by the French Naval Minister Charles de Dompierre d'Hornoy, who wanted new designs for station ironclads. Sabattier's initial design included four main battery guns arranged as in Amiral Duperré: all in open barbettes, two side-by-side forward and the other two on the centerline aft. These were supplemented with a single heavy bow chaser, but during construction, a stern chaser was added, since the aft main battery guns were masked by the ships' rigging.

=== Characteristics and machinery ===
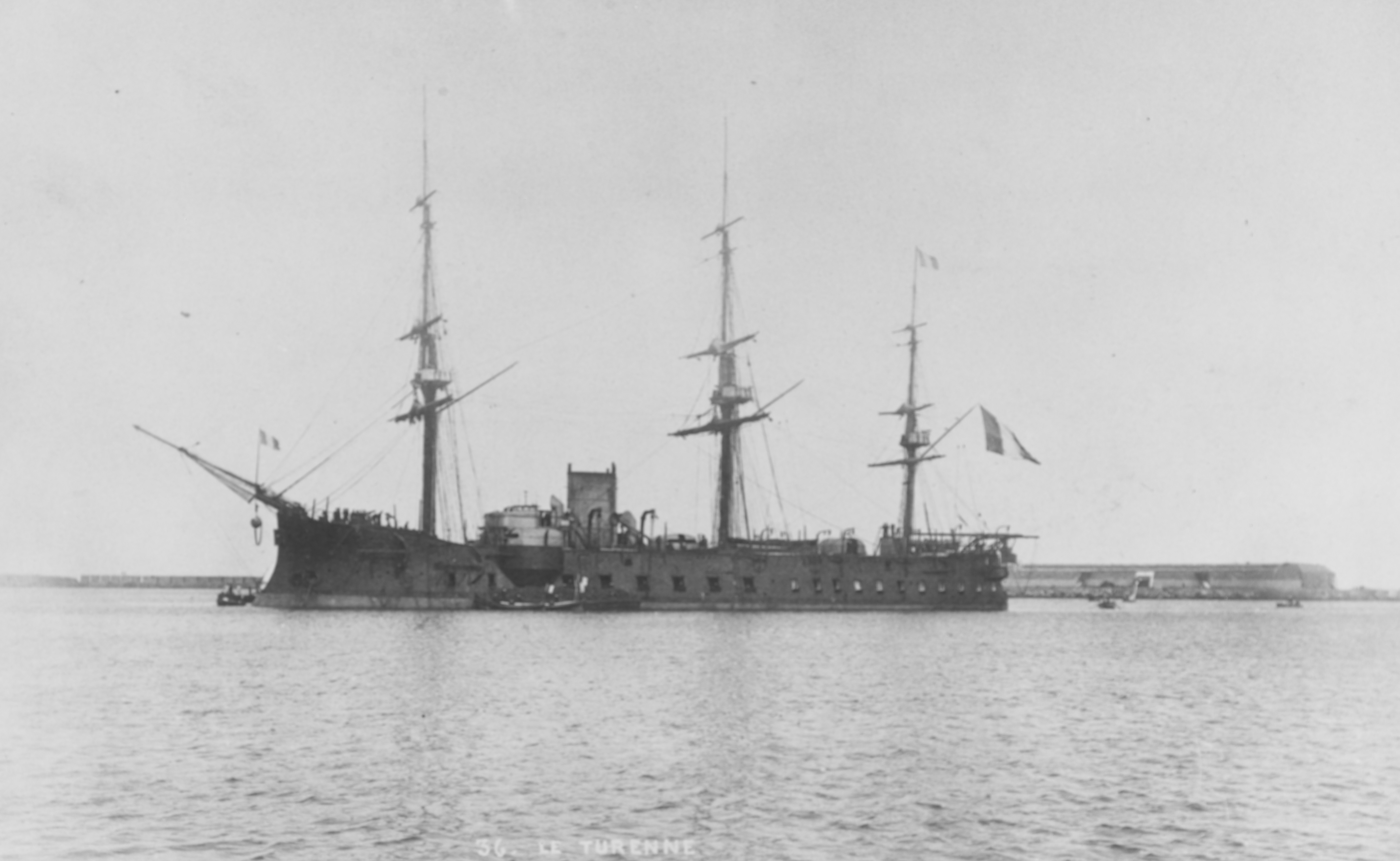
Turenne, date unknown; the photo was likely taken while she was in Algiers in March 1885.

The ships of the Bayard class were 81.22 m (266 ft 6 in) long at the waterline and 78.78 m (258 ft 6 in) long between perpendiculars. They had a beam of 17.45 m (57 ft) and an average draft of 7.49 m (24 ft 7 in). They displaced 6,363 metric tons (6,263 long tons; 7,014 short tons). The ships had a sharply raked forecastle and relatively minimal superstructure, consisting of a small bridge directly astern of the forward main battery barbettes. Unlike several of their French predecessors, the Bayard-class ships disposed with iron hulls and reverted to wooden hulls, which were sheathed in copper to reduce fouling on extended voyages overseas, where shipyard facilities were less available. This may have been the result of British reports of hull corrosion with their iron-hulled vessels. Their crews numbered 24 officers and 425 enlisted men.

Their propulsion machinery consisted of two compound steam engines, each driving a single screw propeller, with steam provided by eight coal-burning fire-tube boilers. The boilers were vented through a pair of uptakes that passed through a single funnel casing; Turenne's casing covered the uptakes entirely, while Bayard's terminated well below the top, giving her the appearance of having a pair of small funnels placed closely together.

Their engines were rated to produce 4,000 indicated horsepower (3,000 kW) for a top speed of 14 knots (26 km/h; 16 mph), and on initial speed trials, Turenne reached 4,158 ihp (3,101 kW) for a top speed of 14.15 knots (26.21 km/h; 16.28 mph). At a more economical speed of 10 knots (19 km/h; 12 mph), the ships had a cruising radius of 3,000 nautical miles (5,600 km; 3,500 mi). To supplement the steam engines on long voyages overseas, they were fitted with a full-ship rig.

=== Armament and armor ===
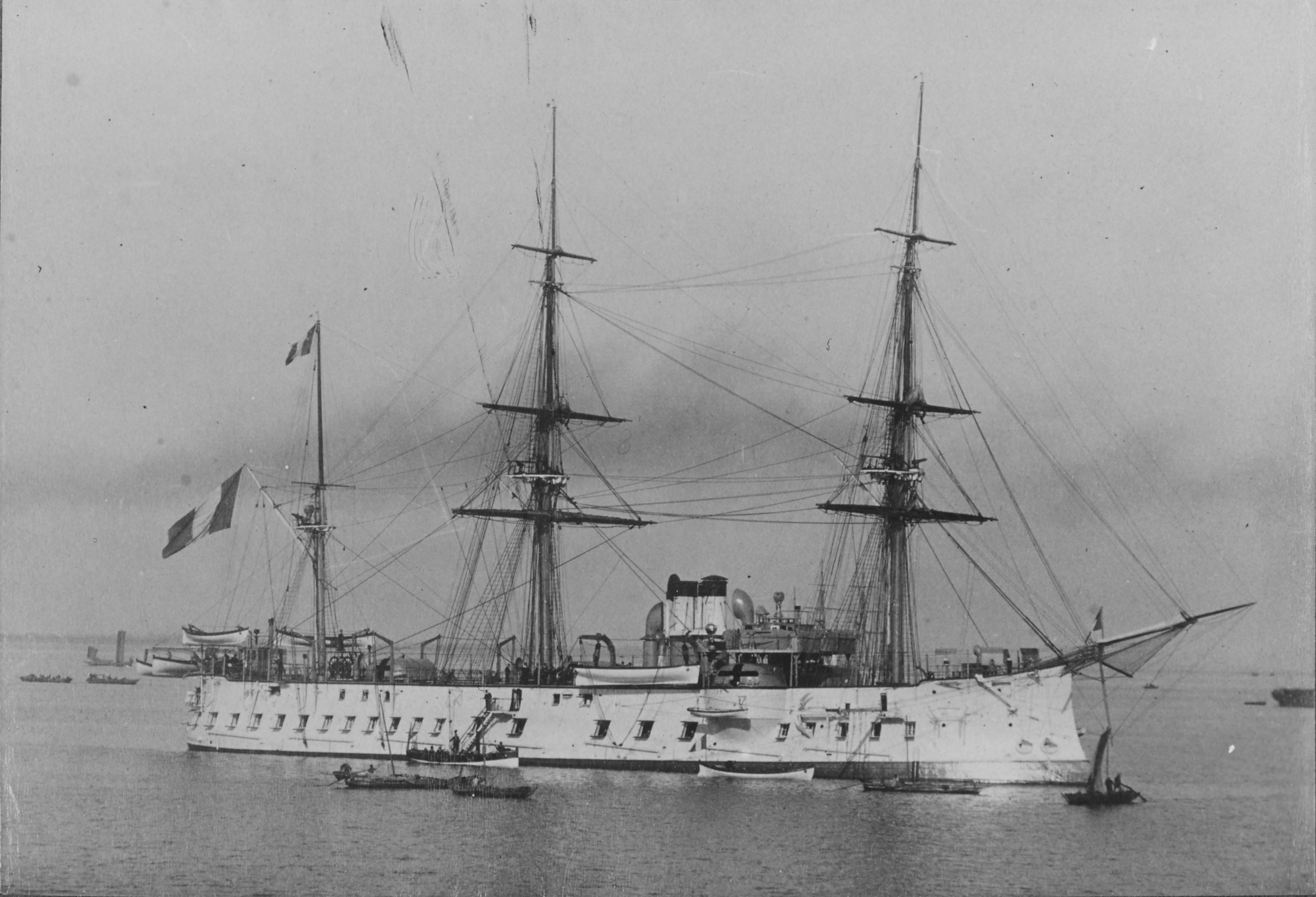
Bayard in the 1880s

Their main battery consisted of four Canon de 24 C modèle 1870 (240 mm (9.4 in)), 19-caliber M1870M guns mounted in individual barbette mounts, two forward placed abreast and two aft, both on the centerline. They carried a pair of 194 mm (7.6 in) 19.8-cal. M1870 guns, one in the bow and one in the stern as chase guns. These guns were supported by a secondary battery of six 138.6 mm (5.46 in) 21.3-cal. M1870 guns carried in a central battery located amidships in the hull, three guns per broadside. They also carried a single 121 mm (4.8 in) 17-cal. 12-pounder bronze rifled gun. Their armament was rounded out with two 356 mm (14 in) torpedo tubes in above-water launchers.

Between 1883 and 1885, both ships had a light battery for defense against torpedo boats installed. This consisted of twelve 37 mm (1.5 in) 1-pounder Hotchkiss revolvers, all in individual mounts. At that time, the bronze gun was removed, and a pair of 65 mm (2.6 in) field guns that could be taken ashore by landing parties were added. By 1890, four 47 mm (1.9 in) 3-pounder Hotchkiss revolver cannon were added to supplement the 37 mm guns.

The ships were protected with wrought iron armor; their belt was 250 mm (9.8 in) thick amidships, where it protected the ships' propulsion machinery spaces and ammunition magazines. The belt extended for the entire length of the hull, but toward the bow it reduced in thickness to 180 mm (7.1 in), and at the stern, it was reduced to 150 mm (5.9 in). The belt extended from 0.91 m (3 ft) above the waterline to 1.99 m (6 ft 6 in) below. Both ships were protected with a 50 mm (2 in) thick deck that covered the full length of the hulls. The barbettes for the main battery were 200 mm (7.9 in) thick.

== Ships ==
Name	Builder	Laid down	Launched	Commissioned
Bayard	Arsenal de Brest	19 September 1876	27 March 1880	22 November 1882
Turenne	Arsenal de Lorient	1 March 1877	16 October 1879	4 February 1882

== Service history ==
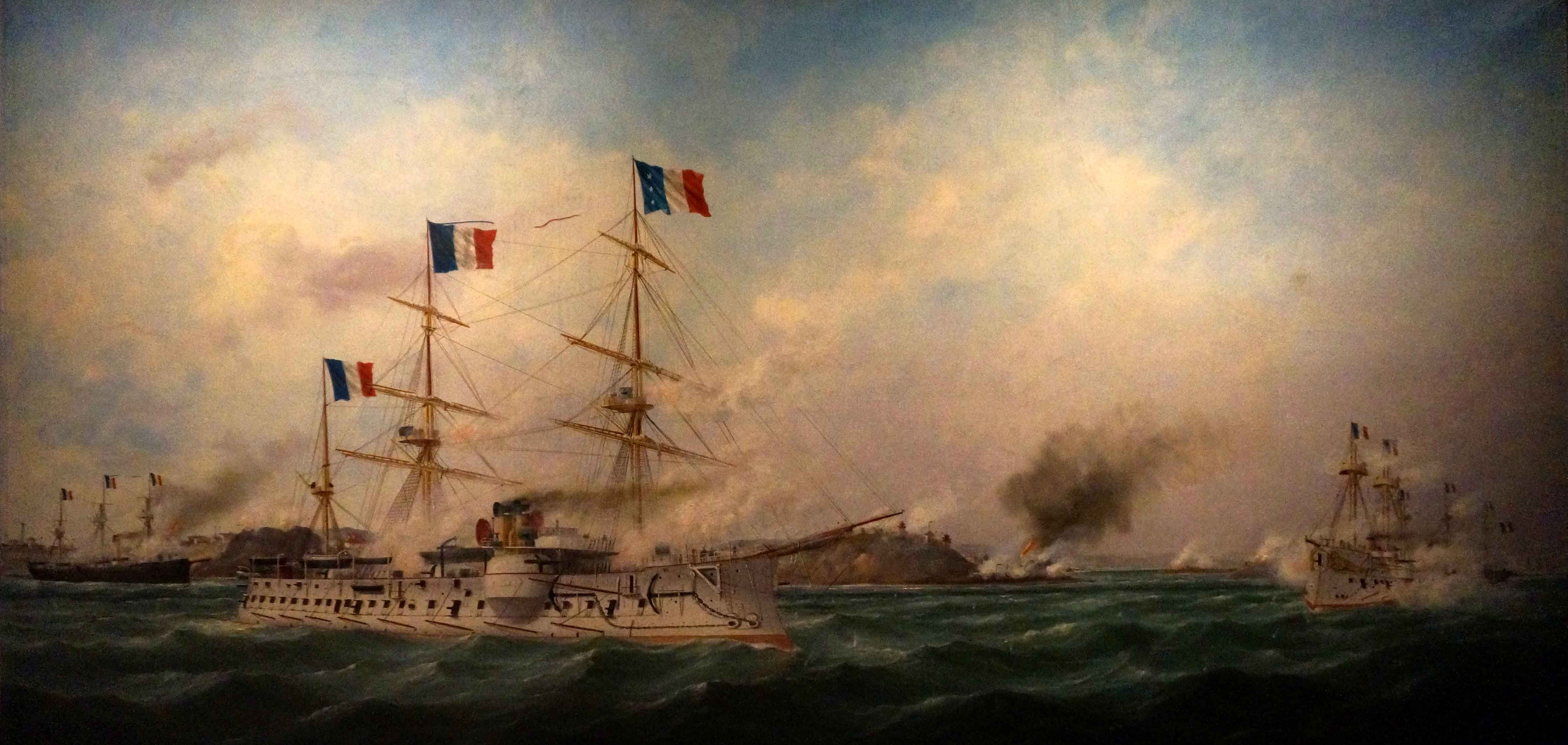
Bayard during the Pescadores campaign in 1885

Upon completion, Turenne was placed in reserve, while Bayard was deployed to the Far East, where she became the flagship of the Division navale du Tonkin (Naval Division of Tonkin), under the command of Vice Admiral Amédée Courbet. There, she saw extensive service during the Tonkin campaign, which established the French protectorate over northern Vietnam and led to the creation of French Indochina. During the war, she took part in the Battle of Thuận An in August 1883. The French intervention in Tonkin resulted in the Sino-French War between France and Qing China, which had previously maintained Tonkin in its sphere of influence. Bayard supported operations during the Keelung campaign, took part in the Battle of Shipu against the Nanyang Fleet in February 1885, and then the Pescadores campaign in March. Courbet died of cholera aboard Bayard in June.

Turenne was recommissioned in 1884 to relieve Bayard as the flagship of the division, remaining there through 1889. During this period, she cruised extensively through East Asia, visiting numerous foreign ports to show the flag. Bayard, for her part, returned home with Courbet's remains in 1885. She later served in the Escadre de la Méditerranée occidentale et du Levant (Eastern Mediterranean and Levant Squadron) from 1889 to 1892. Turenne returned to France in 1889 and was placed in reserve in April 1890. Bayard returned to the Far East in 1893, resuming her role as the divisional flagship there. She remained in East Asia through 1899. Bayard was struck from the naval register in April 1899 and was thereafter used as a storage hulk in Hạ Long Bay in northern French Indochina from 1899 to 1904, when she was sold to ship breakers. In the meantime, Turenne was struck in September 1900, placed for sale in 1901 and subsequently discarded.
