= Vauban-class ironclad =

Ironclad warship class of the French Navy

- Duguesclin in port, date unknown

Class overview
- Operators: French Navy
- Preceded by: Bayard class
- Succeeded by: Terrible class
- Built: 1878–1886
- In commission: 1885–1904
- Completed: 2
- Scrapped: 2

General characteristics
- Type: Ironclad warship
- Displacement: 6,207.6 t (6,109.6 long tons; 6,842.7 short tons)
- Length: 84.7 m (277 ft 11 in) loa
- Beam: 17.45 m (57 ft)
- Draft: 7.39 m (24 ft 3 in)
- Installed power: 8 × fire-tube boilers; 4,000 indicated horsepower (3,000 kW)
- Propulsion: 2 × compound steam engines; 2 × screw propellers
- Speed: 14 kn (26 km/h; 16 mph)
- Range: 2,380.5 nmi (4,408.7 km; 2,739.4 mi) at 12.8 knots (23.7 km/h; 14.7 mph)
- Crew: 24 officers; 450 enlisted men
- Armament: 4 × 240 mm (9.4 in) guns; 1 × 194 mm (7.6 in) gun; 6 × 138.6 mm (5.46 in) guns; 12 × 37 mm (1.5 in) Hotchkiss revolver cannon; 2 × 356 mm (14 in) torpedo tubes
- Armor: Belt: 150 to 250 mm (5.9 to 9.8 in); Barbettes: 200 mm (7.9 in); Deck: 50 mm (2 in); Conning tower: 30 mm (1.2 in)

The Vauban class, sometimes referred to as the Duguesclin class, was a pair of two ironclad barbette ships built for the French Navy in the late 1870s and 1880s. The class consisted of Vauban, the lead ship, and Duguesclin. They were based on the ironclad Amiral Duperré, adopting the same general arrangement, but were scaled down in size. They were intended for use overseas in the French colonial empire, and as such, they retained a sailing rig for long-range cruising and copper sheathing for their hulls to protect them when they would be unable to be dry-docked regularly. They carried a main battery of four 240 mm (9.4 in) guns that were mounted in individual barbettes; two were in sponsons forward, abreast of the conning tower, and the other two were on the centerline aft.

Despite the Navy's intention to use them overseas, both members of the class served with the Mediterranean Squadron for the majority of their careers, from the 1880s to the mid-1890s. They were occupied with peacetime training exercises, and in 1893, they were reduced to the Reserve Division of the squadron. They were laid up after 1895, and Duguesclin saw no further active service, being struck from the naval register in 1904 and sold to ship breakers the following year. Vauban was recommissioned in 1898 for a tour in French Indochina, briefly serving as a divisional flagship, before being stationed in Saigon from 1899 to 1905. After being struck from the register that year, she served as a depot ship, first for torpedo boats and then for submarines from 1905 to 1914, before ultimately being sold in 1919.

== Design ==
The Vauban class of barbette ships, sometimes known as the Duguesclin class, was designed in the late 1870s as part of a naval construction program that began under the post-Franco-Prussian War fleet plan of 1872. At the time, the French Navy categorized its capital ships as high-seas ships for the main fleet, station ironclads for use in the French colonial empire, and smaller coastal defense ships. The Vauban class was intended to serve in the second role, and they were in most respects similar to the preceding Bayard class of station ironclads. Both designs were based on the high-seas ironclad Amiral Duperré, albeit a scaled-down version.

The Vauban design, which had been prepared by Victorin Sabattier and Alfred Lebelin de Dionne, differed from the Bayards in several significant respects. First, the designers abandoned the traditional wooden hull in favor of composite iron-and-steel construction, which had been under evaluation for several years. Second, they replaced the three-masted full-ship rig with a two-masted brig rig; this permitted the stern-most main battery gun to fire directly astern, which allowed them to remove the stern chase gun mounted in the earlier vessels. Lebelin de Dionne submitted the plans on 30 November 1876, and they were approved by Léon Martin Fourichon, the French Naval Minister, on 26 December.

=== Characteristics ===
Profile, upper deck, and battery deck drawing of the Vauban class

The ships of the Vauban class were 81.55 m (267 ft 7 in) long at the waterline, 81.9 m (268 ft 8 in) long between perpendiculars, and 84.7 m (277 ft 11 in) long overall. They had a beam of 17.45 m (57 ft) and a draft of 7.39 m (24 ft 3 in). They displaced 6,207.6 t (6,109.6 long tons; 6,842.7 short tons). The ships had a minimal superstructure, with a small conning tower placed between the forward guns. Their hulls were constructed with iron and steel, sheathed in wood and were coppered to protect them from biofouling during extended periods abroad where dry dock facilities were less available. As was typical for French capital ships of the period, their hulls featured a pronounced tumblehome shape and a ram bow. The crew numbered between 440 and 500 officers and enlisted men.

Their propulsion machinery consisted of two 3-cylinder compound steam engines with steam provided by eight coal-burning fire-tube boilers that each had two fireboxes. The boilers were ducted into a single funnel directly astern of the conning tower. The engines were rated to produce 4,000 indicated horsepower (3,000 kW) for a top speed of 14 knots (26 km/h; 16 mph). Coal storage amounted to 459 t (452 long tons; 506 short tons), which gave the ships a cruising radius of 2,380.5 nautical miles (4,408.7 km; 2,739.4 mi) at a speed of 12.8 knots (23.7 km/h; 14.7 mph). To supplement the steam engines, they were fitted with a brig sail rig with a total area of 2,160 m^{2} (23,200 sq ft). Later in their careers, their sailing rigs were removed and their masts carried only fighting tops.

The ships' main battery consisted of four Canon de 24 C modèle 1870 (240 mm (9.4 in)), 19-caliber M1870M guns mounted in individual barbette mounts, two forward placed abreast in sponsons and two aft, both on the centerline. They carried a 194 mm (7.6 in) 19.8-cal. M1870 gun in the bow as a chase gun. These guns were supported by a secondary battery of six 138.6 mm (5.46 in) 21.3-cal. M1870 guns carried in an unarmored, central battery located amidships in the hull, three guns per broadside. For defense against torpedo boats, the ships carried twelve 37 mm (1.5 in) 1-pounder Hotchkiss revolvers, all in individual mounts. Their armament was rounded out with two 356 mm (14 in) torpedo tubes in above-water launchers, which were supplied with M1880 torpedoes.

The ships were protected with wrought iron armor; their belt was 250 mm (10 in) thick amidships, where it protected the ships' ammunition magazines and propulsion machinery spaces, and it tapered to 152 mm (6 in) at the bottom edge. The belt extended for the entire length of the hull, but at the bow it was reduced to 180 mm (7.1 in) at the waterline, and at the stern, it was reduced to 150 mm (5.9 in). The belt covered the side of the ships from 1.25 m (4 ft 1 in) above the waterline to 1.6 m (5 ft 3 in) below. An armor deck that was 50 mm (2 in) connected to the top edge of the belt. Compound armor that was 200 mm (7.9 in) thick was used for the main battery barbettes. The conning tower had 30 mm (1.2 in) of iron plate on the sides.

=== Modifications ===
The ships underwent a series of modifications over the course of their careers. Duguesclin received a pair of 47 mm (1.9 in) guns in place of two of her 37 mm guns. In 1890, Vauban had a secondary conning position for an admiral and his staff installed, which received 25 mm (1 in) of iron plating on the sides. Duguesclin received another four 47 mm guns in 1893. In 1896–1897, Vauban was re-boilered, and by 1898, her armament had been revised along the lines of her sister ship. At that time, her armament consisted of the existing 240 mm and 194 mm guns, but an additional pair of 138.6 mm guns were added to the central battery. No additional ammunition magazines were installed for these guns, so they had to be supplied from the existing magazines. Six 47 mm (1.9 in) M1885 quick-firing guns were added to the anti-torpedo boat battery.

== Ships ==
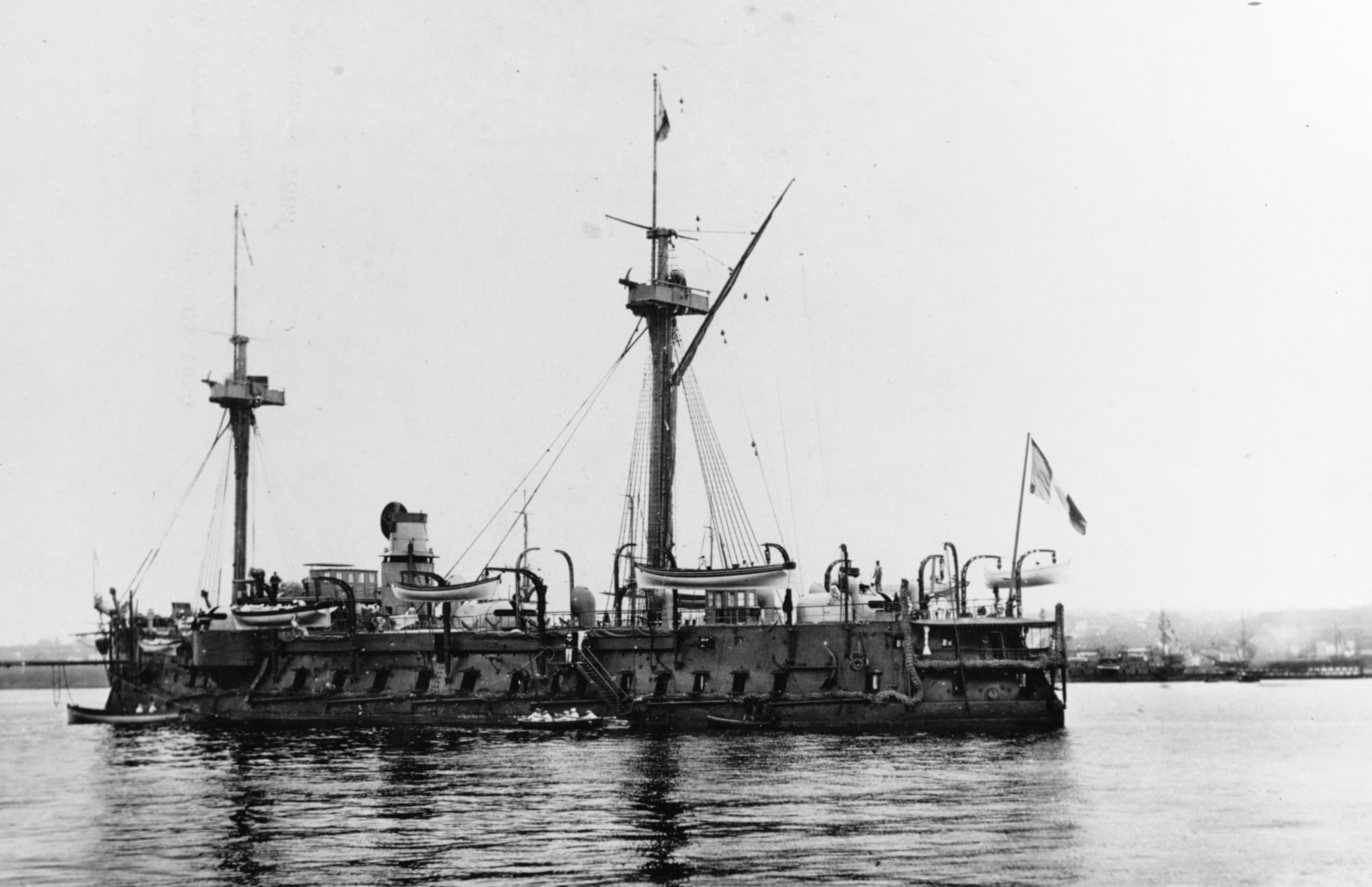
Vauban in port, date unknown

Name	Builder	Laid down	Launched	Completed
Vauban	Arsenal of Cherbourg	1 August 1877	3 July 1882	9 March 1886 (full)
Duguesclin	Rochefort	March 1877	7 April 1883	1 January 1886 (trials)

== Service histories ==
The two ships of the Vauban class served with the Mediterranean Squadron after entering service, though Duguesclin was initially placed in reserve between 1886 and 1888. Through the late 1880s and early 1890s, they took part in the peacetime routine of training exercises with the rest of the fleet. Vauban served as the flagship of the 3rd Division of the squadron in the early 1890s. In 1893, both vessels were transferred to the Reserve Division, where they spent half the year in commission for training maneuvers. Rated as armored cruisers by that time, they spent two years in the unit before newer, purpose-built cruisers took their places. They were then placed out of commission in 2nd category reserve, kept only to be mobilized in the event of war. Duguesclin saw no further active service, was struck from the naval register in 1904, and was sold to ship breakers the following year.

In 1899, Vauban was recommissioned for another tour in French Indochina, where she briefly served as the flagship of one of the divisions in the Far East Squadron. She was relieved as flagship by the protected cruiser D'Entrecasteaux, though she remained in the unit. She was then stationed in Saigon, French Indochina, where she largely remained for the next six years. In 1905, she was struck from the naval register; she thereafter served as a depot ship for a flotilla of torpedo boats based at Hongay, French Indochina, from 1905 to 1910, then as a depot ship for submarines based at Saigon from 1910 to 1914. She was eventually sold for scrap in 1919.
