= French ironclad Amiral Duperré =

Ironclad warship of the French Navy

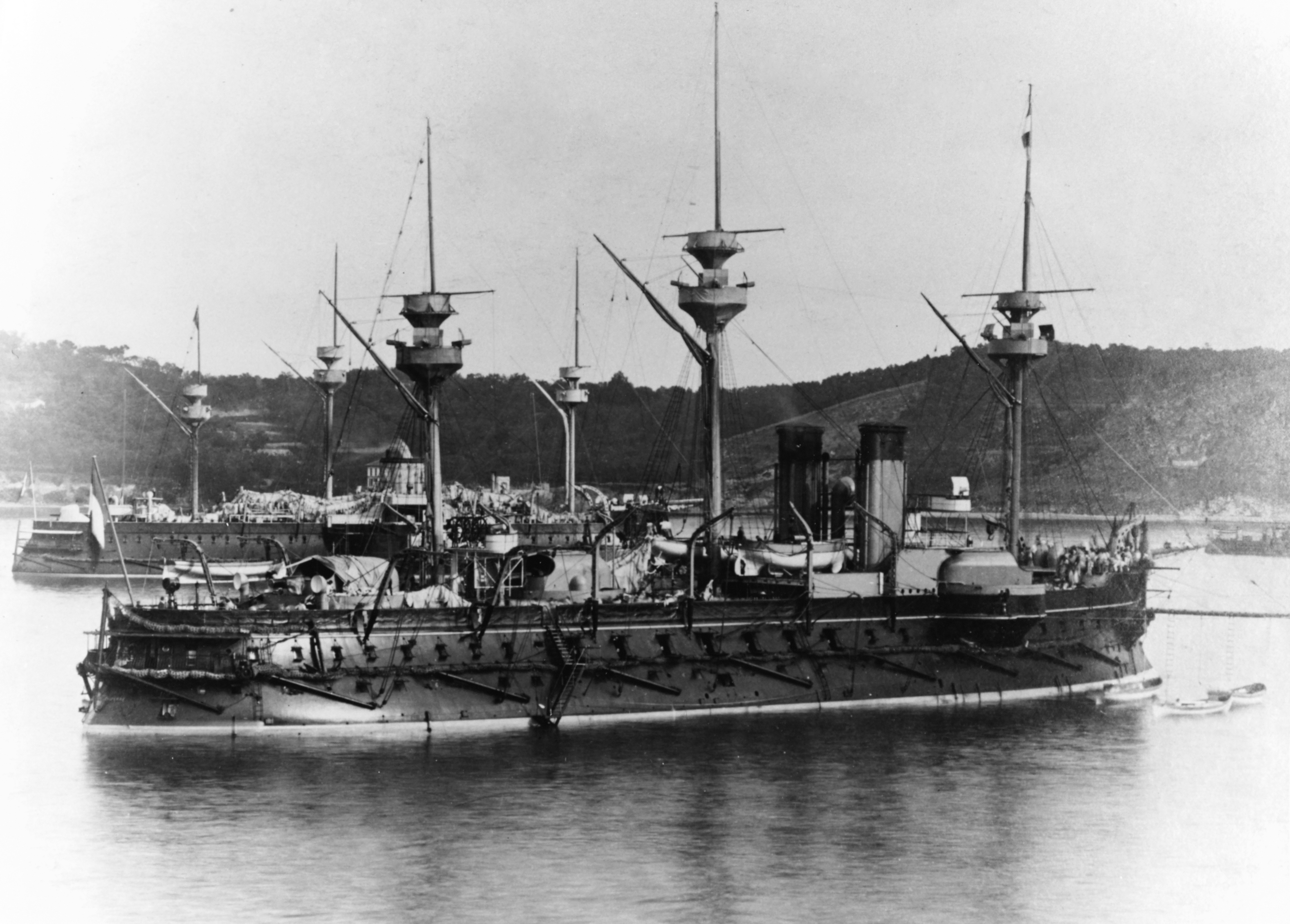
- Amiral Duperré in Villefranche-sur-Mer around 1890

Class overview
- Preceded by: Dévastation class
- Succeeded by: Bayard class

History

France
- Name: Amiral Duperré
- Namesake: Guy-Victor Duperré
- Builder: Société Nouvelle des Forges et Chantiers de la Méditerranée
- Laid down: 7 December 1876
- Launched: 11 September 1879
- Commissioned: April 1883
- Decommissioned: 20 September 1905
- Stricken: 13 August 1906
- Fate: Broken up after 1909

General characteristics
- Type: Unique ironclad battleship
- Displacement: 11,200 tonnes
- Length: 97.48 m (319 ft 10 in) lwl
- Beam: 20.4 m (66 ft 11 in)
- Draft: 8.43 m (27 ft 8 in)
- Installed power: 12 × fire-tube boilers; 7,300 indicated horsepower (5,400 kW)
- Propulsion: 2 × compound steam engines; 2 × screw propellers
- Speed: 14 knots (26 km/h; 16 mph)
- Complement: 660
- Armament: 4 × 340 mm (13.4 in) guns; 1 × 163 mm (6.4 in) gun; 14 × 138 mm (5.4 in) guns
- Armor: Belt: 254 to 559 mm (10 to 22 in); Barbettes: 305 mm (12 in); Gun shields: 51 mm (2 in); Conning tower: 38 mm (1.5 in)

Amiral Duperré was an ironclad barbette ship built for the French Navy in the 1870s and 1880s; she was the first vessel of that type built by France. She carried her main battery of four 34 cm (13.4 in) guns individually in open barbette mountings, which offered increased fields of fire compared to earlier central battery ships, though they were less well protected. Amiral Duperré was ordered as part of a French naval construction program aimed at countering the growth of the Italian fleet, which had begun work on the very large ironclads of the Duilio and Italia classes in the early 1870s. The Italian vessels, armed with 45 cm (17.7 in) guns, prompted public outcry in France that pressured the navy to develop larger guns for its own ships. Amiral Duperré's design served as the basis for several follow-on classes, including the Bayard and Amiral Baudin classes.

The ship served with the Mediterranean Squadron for most of her active career. In the 1880s and 1890s, the ship took part in numerous training exercises. She suffered an accidental explosion in one of her main guns, though reports of the timing and casualties vary. Amiral Duperré was reduced to the Reserve Division in 1895, serving as its flagship for the next three years. The ship continued to regularly participate in training maneuvers with the rest of the squadron. By the late 1890s, more modern pre-dreadnought battleships began to enter service, and in 1898, she was transferred to the Northern Squadron, based in the English Channel. In 1901, the ship was withdrawn from service to be modernized as part of a program to upgrade the ironclads still in service, though by the time work was completed after 1905, Amiral Duperré saw no further active duty. Instead, she was struck from the naval register in 1909 and subsequently broken up.

== Design ==
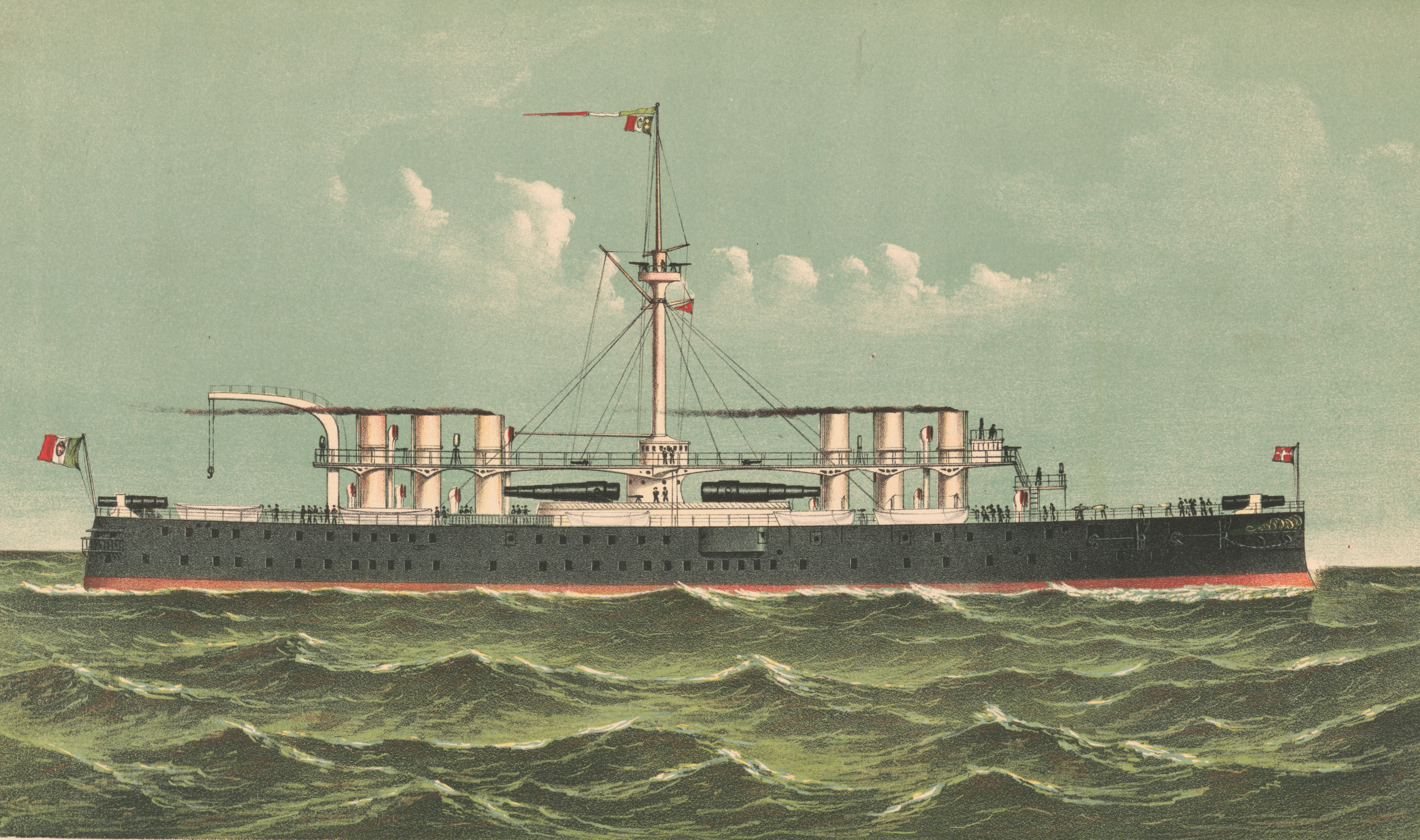
Italia, one of the vessels that prompted Amiral Duperré's construction

In the aftermath of the Franco-Prussian War of 1870–1871, the French Navy embarked on a construction program to strengthen the fleet in 1872. The initial ships followed the same general pattern as the ships built in the 1860s, but by the early 1870s, the French design staff in the Conseil des travaux (Board of Construction) had to grapple with the challenges posed by technological developments and foreign construction programs.

In the early 1870s, the Italian Regia Marina (Royal Navy) had begun its own expansion program under the direction of Benedetto Brin, which included the construction of several very large ironclad warships of the Duilio and Italia classes, armed with 450 mm (17.7 in) 100-ton guns. The French initially viewed the ships as not worthy of concern, though by 1877, public pressure over the new Italian vessels prompted the Navy to order Amiral Duperré. The public outcry also forced the French to design new steel guns to compete with the gigantic Italian guns; the 320 mm (12.6 in) Model 1870 gun was quickly surpassed by the 340 mm (13.4 in) Model 1875, which was installed aboard Amiral Duperré.

As the power of guns continued to grow, thicker armor was needed to protect the ships; the full side armor of earlier ironclads could not be thickened without prohibitively increasing displacement. This led to intense discussions in France (and in foreign navies) as to the best way to protect new capital ships; in France, designers considered décuirassement (de-armoring) their next generation of ironclads. This involved eliminating most of the side armor of the hull and concentrating a sufficient thickness at the waterline only. Guns would be placed in lightly armored barbettes on the upper deck. The French decision was driven by a desire to protect their ships' ability to maneuver, as the unarmored ends of the citadel ships could be easily damaged and flooded. They viewed the ram as a decisive weapon, and a vessel that could no longer maneuver effectively would easily fall victim to a ramming attack. The French differed from their British and Italian counterparts, who decided to shorten the length of their belt armor to save the weight necessary to thicken the remaining portion of armor.

Work on the design began with French Naval Minister Charles de Dompierre d'Hornoy's order for the Conseil des travaux to prepare two options for the new first-class ironclad on 20 October 1873. Work on the project was led by the Director of Materiel, Victorin Sabattier. One of the options, a combination barbette and central battery ship, was developed further into the Dévastation class. The other, which carried all of its heavy guns in barbettes on the upper deck, went through a series of alterations and Sabattier eventually submitted it to Léon Martin Fourichon, who was then the naval minister, on 8 March 1876. Fourichon approved it on 5 August, and the contract for the vessel was awarded on 4 December. Apart from the main battery arrangement, the ship was in most respects similar to the Dévastations.

The ship provided the basis for the very similar Amiral Baudin design; most of the French ironclads built in the 1880s were developed from these two designs. The Bayard and Vauban classes, intended for overseas deployments in the French colonial empire, were scaled down versions of Amiral Duperré.

=== Characteristics ===
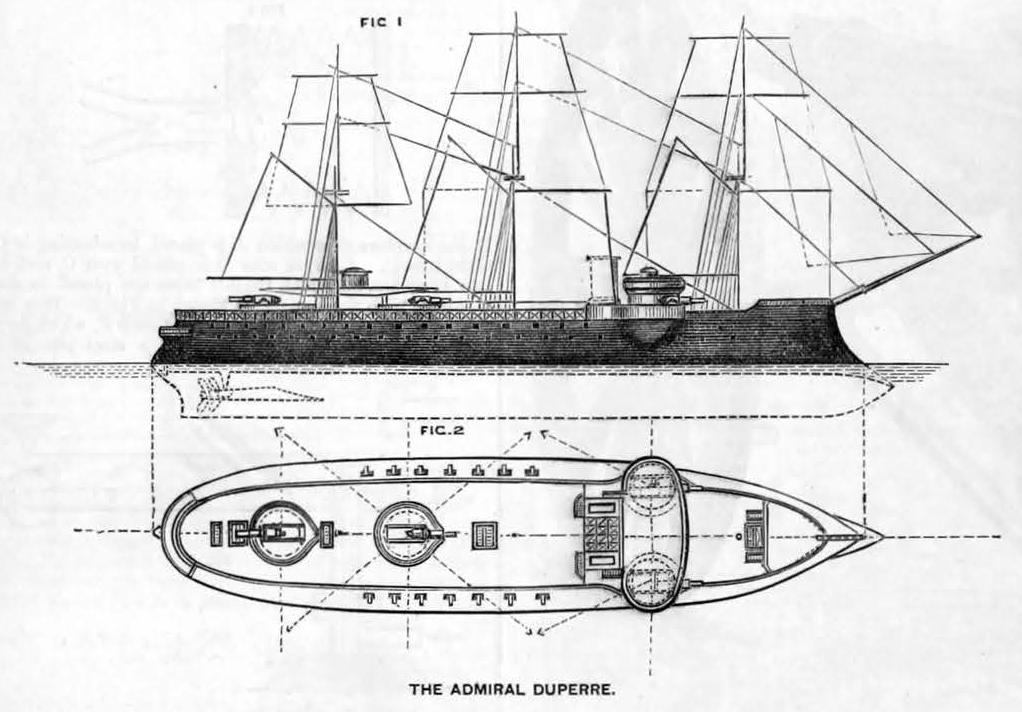
Side and top views of Amiral Duperré

Amiral Duperré was 96.97 m (318 ft 2 in) long at the waterline and 101.6 m (333 ft 4 in) long overall, with a beam of 20.4 m (66 ft 11 in) and a draft of 8.43 m (27 ft 8 in) aft. She displaced 11,030 long tons (11,210 t). Her hull featured a pronounced ram bow and had a short forecastle deck that extended from the stem to the forward main battery guns. A small conning tower was placed between the forward barbettes and a secondary tower was placed aft, between the stern barbettes. Her hull was divided by sixteen watertight transverse bulkheads and several longitudinal bulkheads. Her transverse metacentric height was about 0.61 m (2 ft). She was fitted with three pole masts equipped with spotting tops for her main battery guns, and she carried two searchlights. The crew consisted of 712 officers and enlisted men.

Her propulsion machinery consisted of two vertical compound steam engines with three cylinders apiece, each driving a screw propeller, with steam provided by twelve coal-burning fire-tube boilers. The boilers were vented through a pair of large funnels located side-by-side just aft of the conning tower. Her engines were rated to produce 7,500 indicated horsepower (5,600 kW). On her initial trials conducted in 1882, her engines reached a maximum of 7,357 ihp (5,486 kW) for a top speed of 14.3 knots (26.5 km/h; 16.5 mph). Coal storage amounted to 787 long tons (800 t). At a cruising speed of 10 knots (19 km/h; 12 mph), the ship could steam for 2,850 nautical miles (5,280 km; 3,280 mi). Amiral Duperré was designed with a three-masted schooner rig to supplement the steam engines, though it was removed before she was completed.

Her main armament consisted of four 340 mm (13.4 in), 18-caliber guns mounted in individual barbette mounts, two side-by-side forward, one amidships, and one aft, the latter pair on the centerline. These guns had a very low rate of fire between seven and fifteen minutes. They were operated with a pressurized water mechanism that worked the training and elevation gear. The guns had to return to the centerline to be reloaded, and only one gun could be moved at a time.

The main battery was supported by a secondary battery of one 163 mm (6.4 in) and fourteen 138 mm (5.4 in) guns, all carried in individual pivot mounts. The 163 mm gun was placed in the bow as a chase gun, while the 138 mm weapons were located in an unarmored gun battery in the main deck, seven guns per broadside. All of these guns had a very limited firing arc. For defense against torpedo boats, she carried twelve 37 mm (1.5 in) 1-pounder Hotchkiss revolver cannon, all in individual mounts. Her armament was rounded out with four 356 mm (14 in) torpedo tubes in above-water mounts. Two tubes were carried on each broadside, one pair ahead and one pair astern.

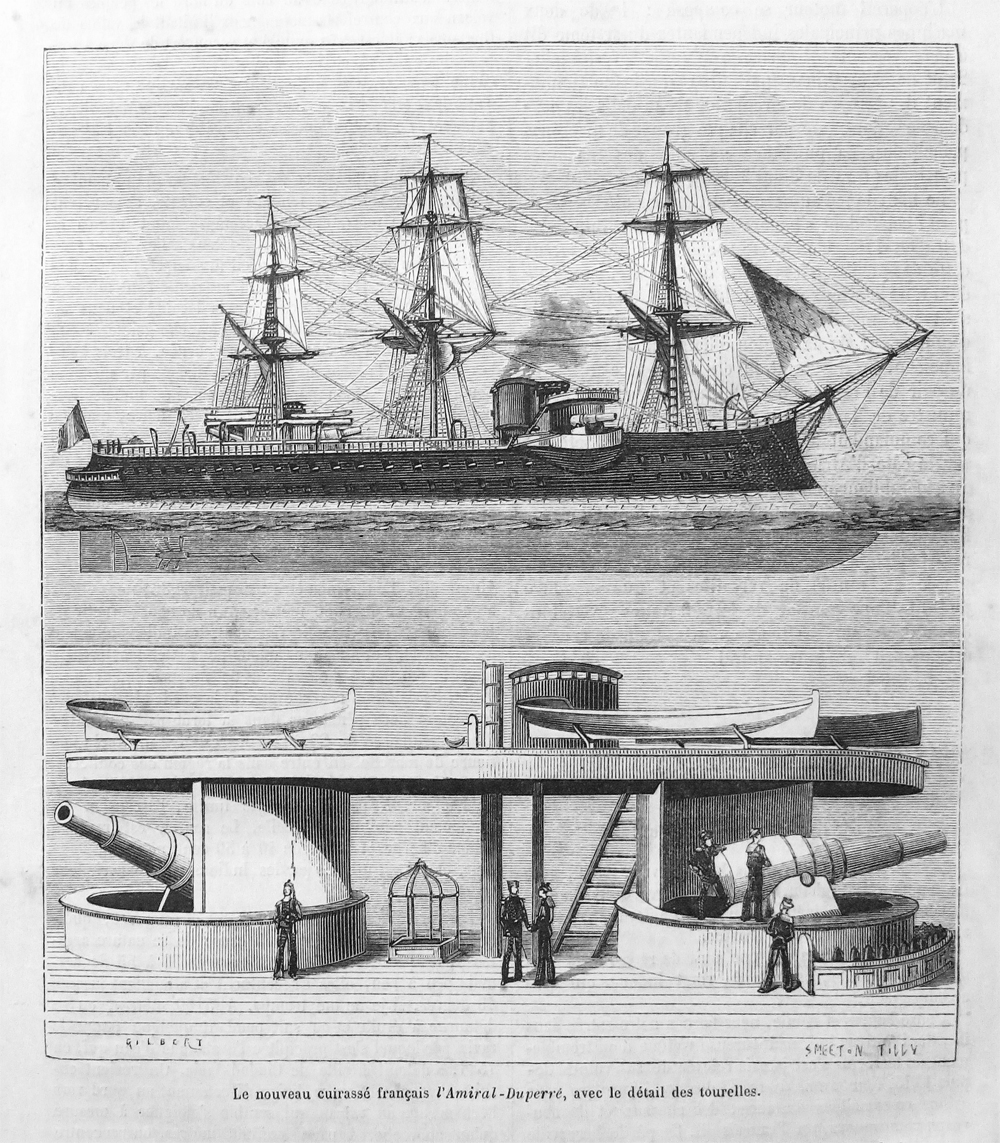
Sketch of Amiral Duperré, including a depiction of the midships and rear barbettes

The ship was protected with wrought iron armor; her belt extended for the entire length of the hull from 0.46 m (1 ft 6 in) above the waterline to 2.01 m (6 ft 7 in) below. It was 559 mm (22 in) thick amidships, tapering to 406 mm (16 in) on the bottom edge, while the bow and stern were protected by 254 mm (10 in) at the waterline. A lower 152 mm (6 in) section extended down at the bow to reinforce the ram. An armor deck connected to the belt at its top and was 61 mm (2.4 in) of mild steel on a layer of 18 mm (0.7 in) plating. The barbettes for the main battery were 305 mm (12 in) thick and the supporting tubes were 100 mm (4 in); the gun shields were 51 mm (2 in). Her conning tower had 38 mm (1.5 in) of mild steel on the sides. Conway's All The World's Fighting Ships notes that "she was very vulnerable above [the waterline] and would not have stood much chance against HMS Inflexible."

=== Modifications ===
During a refit in 1887, the number of 37 mm guns was increased to eighteen. An additional pair of search lights was fitted as well. In 1892, three of her main battery guns were replaced with the slightly longer 21-caliber M1881 variant of the 340 mm gun, though she retained one of the shorter, original weapons. The light battery was expanded significantly with a pair of 65 mm (2.6 in) guns, two 47 mm (1.9 in) 3-pounder Hotchkiss guns, and sixteen 37 mm guns. The torpedo tubes were updated to the M1885 model.

By 1895, the old 340 mm gun was replaced with an updated version, and the 138.6 mm guns were replaced with new 100 mm (3.9 in) guns. The 47 mm guns were removed and four more 65 mm guns were added. She also had her masts reduced to two, which were fitted with two fighting tops apiece.

Amiral Duperré was withdrawn from service in 1901 to be modernized, along with many other French capital ships of the period. The ship received new water-tube boilers and her engines were overhauled. The center 340 mm gun and its barbette were removed, and an armored battery of 163 mm guns was installed in their place.

== Service history ==
=== Construction – 1889 ===
The keel for Amiral Duperré was laid down at the Société Nouvelle des Forges et Chantiers de la Méditerranée shipyard in La Seyne-sur-Mer outside of Toulon in January 1877. The new ship was to be named for Admiral Guy-Victor Duperré. She was launched on 11 September 1879 and fitting-out work on her machinery was completed by 11 May 1881. She was placed in limited commission ten days earlier with a crew of 99 men to conduct her trials, which lasted through 20 November 1882. The ship was placed in full commission on 17 April 1883, and five days later, she joined the Mediterranean Squadron, based in Toulon. On 2–3 March 1886, she took part in experiments with torpedo boats to determine the effectiveness of various attack angles. Later on the 3rd, Amiral Duperré and the ironclads Colbert, Friedland, Redoutable, Suffren, and Dévastation conducted shooting practice using the old ironclad Armide as a target. They fired at a range of 2,700 to 4,600 m (3,000 to 5,000 yd) and scored 22 percent hits with cast iron practice shells, though they conducted the test under unrealistic conditions, with Armide anchored in a calm sea. The year's large-scale maneuvers were held off Toulon from 10 to 17 May, and they tested the effectiveness of torpedo boats in defending the coastline from a squadron of ironclads, whether cruisers and torpedo boats could break through a blockade of ironclads, and whether a flotilla of torpedo boats could intercept ironclads at sea.

Illustration of Amiral Duperré c. 1889

Another major set of exercises was held from 2 to 12 June at Ajaccio on the island of Corsica; Amiral Duperré and several other ironclads simulated a fleet attacking the port, which was defended by a coastal defense ship, three cruisers, and twenty torpedo boats. The ironclad squadron thereafter sailed to Oran, French Algeria, for another round of maneuvers that began on 25 June. During these exercises, the ironclads simulated an enemy fleet passing through the Strait of Gibraltar to attack the French Mediterranean coast; torpedo boats attempted to intercept them off Mallorca. From the year's maneuvers, the French concluded that the torpedo boats of the day were not sufficiently powerful enough to achieve any of the goals that had been assigned to them, particularly further from coast, but nevertheless still posed significant threats to blockading warships. These lessons spurred the development of larger torpedo boats better able to operate at sea. Later that year, Amiral Duperré underwent repairs to her boilers; the work lasted into 1887.

In May 1887, Amiral Duperré took part in exercises to practice convoy escort; the French Army kept significant forces in French North Africa, and these units would have to be transported back to Europe in the event of a major conflict. The ship was assigned to escort a convoy of four simulated troop ships, along with Colbert and the ironclads Courbet and Indomptable. A squadron of cruisers and torpedo boats was tasked with intercepting the convoy. The convoy used bad weather to make the passage, as heavy seas kept the torpedo boats from going to sea.

At some point, one of the ship's main guns accidentally exploded, blowing its breech, though reports conflict over the timing and the results of the incident. According to the contemporary journal The Naval Annual, the explosion took place on 13 December 1888 and killed six men from the gun crew. That report offered two explanations, as different experts faulted the brown powder propellant charge, which was believed to have decayed, or defects in the steel breech, as the guns carried by Amiral Duperré were among the earliest steel-built guns in French service. But the historian Theodore Ropp stated that it was the result of an increased propellant charge. By the early 1880s, the French had developed more effective, slower-burning propellants, and had bored out the chambers of existing guns to accept larger charges of the new powder. Amiral Duperré's gun was the only weapon that had been modified to have failed. And according to Ropp, no men were killed in the accident.

=== 1889–1909 ===
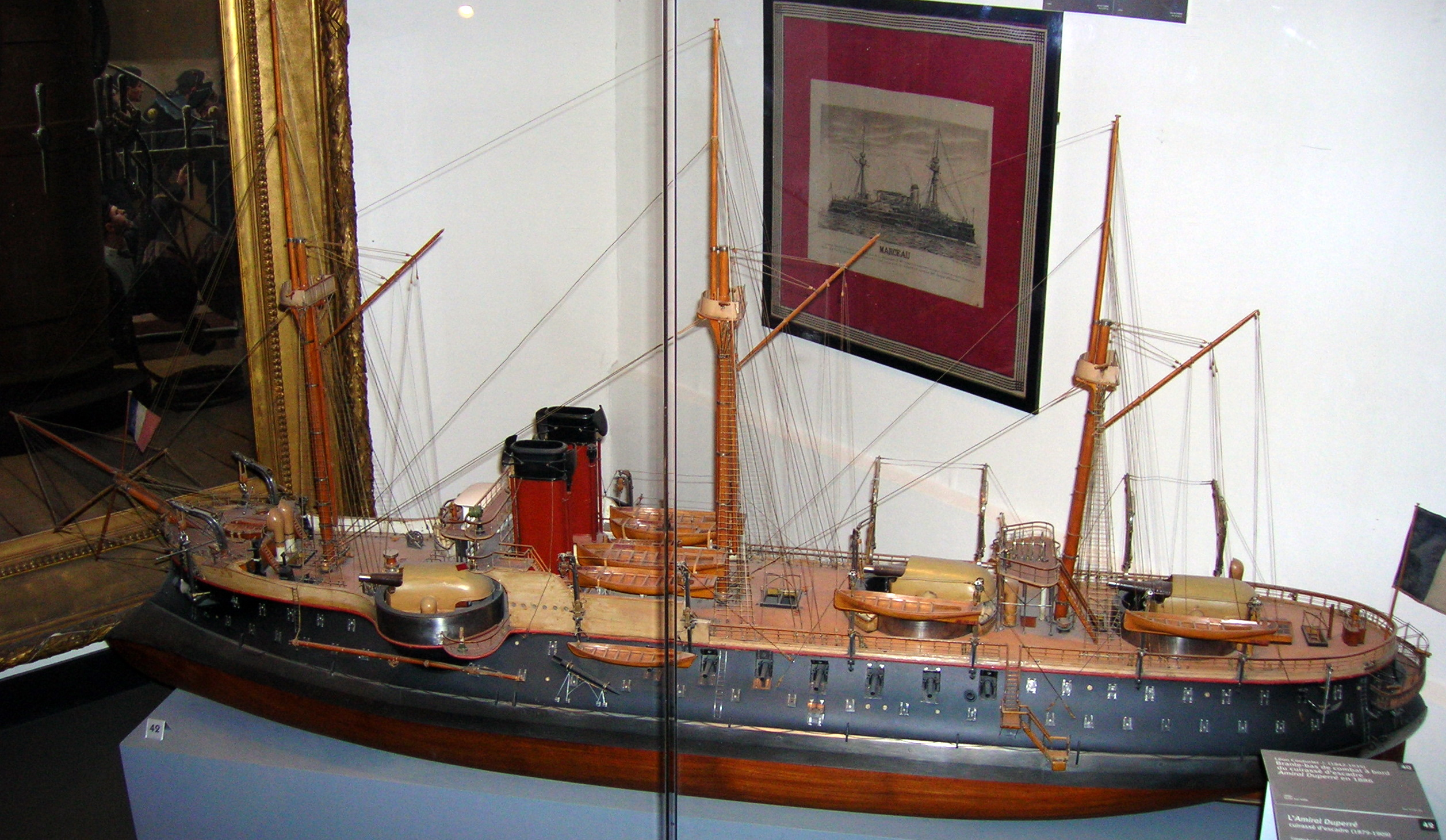
Scale model on display at the Musée de la Marine in Paris

Amiral Duperré took part in the 1889 fleet maneuvers in company with her division-mates and six other ironclads, along with numerous smaller craft. Amiral Duperré served as part of the French force during the maneuvers, which lasted from 30 June to 6 July. A second round of exercises was held later that month, beginning on 23 July. The enemy squadron conducted a simulated attack on Toulon that night, but poor weather prevented further operations and the maneuvers were cancelled later on the 24th. She served in the 1st Division of the Mediterranean Squadron in 1890, along with the two Amiral Baudin-class ironclads. During the 1890 fleet maneuvers, the ship served in the 1st Division of the 1st Squadron of the Mediterranean Fleet. At the time, the division also included the ironclads Courbet and Formidable. The ships concentrated off Oran, French Algeria on 22 June and then proceeded to Brest, France, arriving there on 2 July for combined operations with the ships of the Northern Squadron. The exercises began four days later and concluded on 25 July, after which Amiral Duperré and the rest of the Mediterranean Fleet returned to Toulon. The ship remained in service with the Mediterranean Fleet in 1892, which by that time had been joined by the three Marceau-class ironclads. She participated in the 1893 maneuvers, again as part of the 2nd Division in company with Amiral Baudin and the ironclad Hoche. The maneuvers included an initial period of exercises from 1 to 10 July and then larger-scale maneuvers from 17 to 28 July.

In late January 1895, Amiral Duperré and the protected cruiser Sfax took part in an experimental bombardment of a simulated coastal fortification on Levant Island. The test lasted six hours and was carried out over the course of three days, so that the effect of shelling could be studied throughout the experiment. It involved over a thousand shots between the two ships, firing calibers ranging from 10 to 34 cm (3.9 to 13.4 in). Neither ship was able to significantly damage the fortifications, though several of the guns were damaged and shell fragments would have inflicted casualties among gun crews. The French determined that an excessive amount of ammunition was required to neutralize the guns, and had the fortification been returning fire, both ships likely would have been seriously damaged. Amiral Duperré suffered an accidental explosion in one of her magazines on 13 May after the compartment became overheated from the adjacent boiler room. Only one shell detonated and the resulting fire was quickly suppressed by the crew. By that year, Amiral Duperré had been reduced to the Reserve Squadron of the Mediterranean Fleet, along with the ironclad Richelieu and three of the Terrible-class ironclads. She served as its flagship through 1896.

Amiral Duperré later in her career

She remained in the Reserve Squadron in 1898, by which time the French Navy had begun rebuilding several of its older ironclads. As a result, the only other members of the unit were Indomptable and Dévastation. She took part in the fleet maneuvers the following year, which lasted from 5 to 25 July. She served as the flagship of Rear Admiral Godin during the maneuvers. Later that year, she was transferred to the Northern Squadron in the English Channel, along with the two Amiral Baudins, Dévastation, Courbet, and Redoutable, since more modern pre-dreadnought battleships built in the mid-1890s had entered service by that time.

Two of these new battleships—Carnot and Masséna—joined Amiral Duperré in the Northern Squadron in 1900, which at that time also included Formidable, Redoutable, and Amiral Baudin. In June and July that year, she participated in extensive joint maneuvers conducted with the Mediterranean Fleet. The Northern Squadron initially held its own maneuvers in Brest, which included a simulated blockade of the squadron in Brest, after which the squadron made mock attacks on the island of Belle Île and nearby Quiberon. In early July, the squadron met the Mediterranean Squadron off Lisbon, Portugal before the two units steamed north to Quiberon Bay and entered Brest on 9 July. Amiral Duperré and the rest of the Northern Squadron were tasked with attacking Cherbourg two days later. The maneuvers concluded with a naval review in Cherbourg on 19 July for President Émile Loubet. While at sea for gunnery practice on 14 December, her starboard forward gun broke free in inclement weather and swung around, striking the bridge and causing significant damage to it and the fore mast. No crewmen were injured in the accident.

Amiral Duperré remained in the unit through early 1901, but she was withdrawn from service later that year to be reconstructed. The work proceeded slowly, and as late as 1905, additional funds had been included in the year's budget to complete the installation of new boilers. Despite the refit, Amiral Duperré saw no further service. By that time, more pre-dreadnoughts had been built, displacing those that had been built in the 1890s to the Northern and Reserve Divisions. She was decommissioned on 20 September 1905 and struck from the naval register on 13 August 1906. On 21 December, the Navy condemned Amiral Duperré and allocated her for use as a target ship. She was eventually sunk off Hyères on 31 August 1908, refloated, and then sunk again on 26 September. Salvage rights were sold on 27 July 1909 to a M. Giardino of Marseille, and the wreck was subsequently broken up.
