= Barbette ship =

Type of ironclad warship

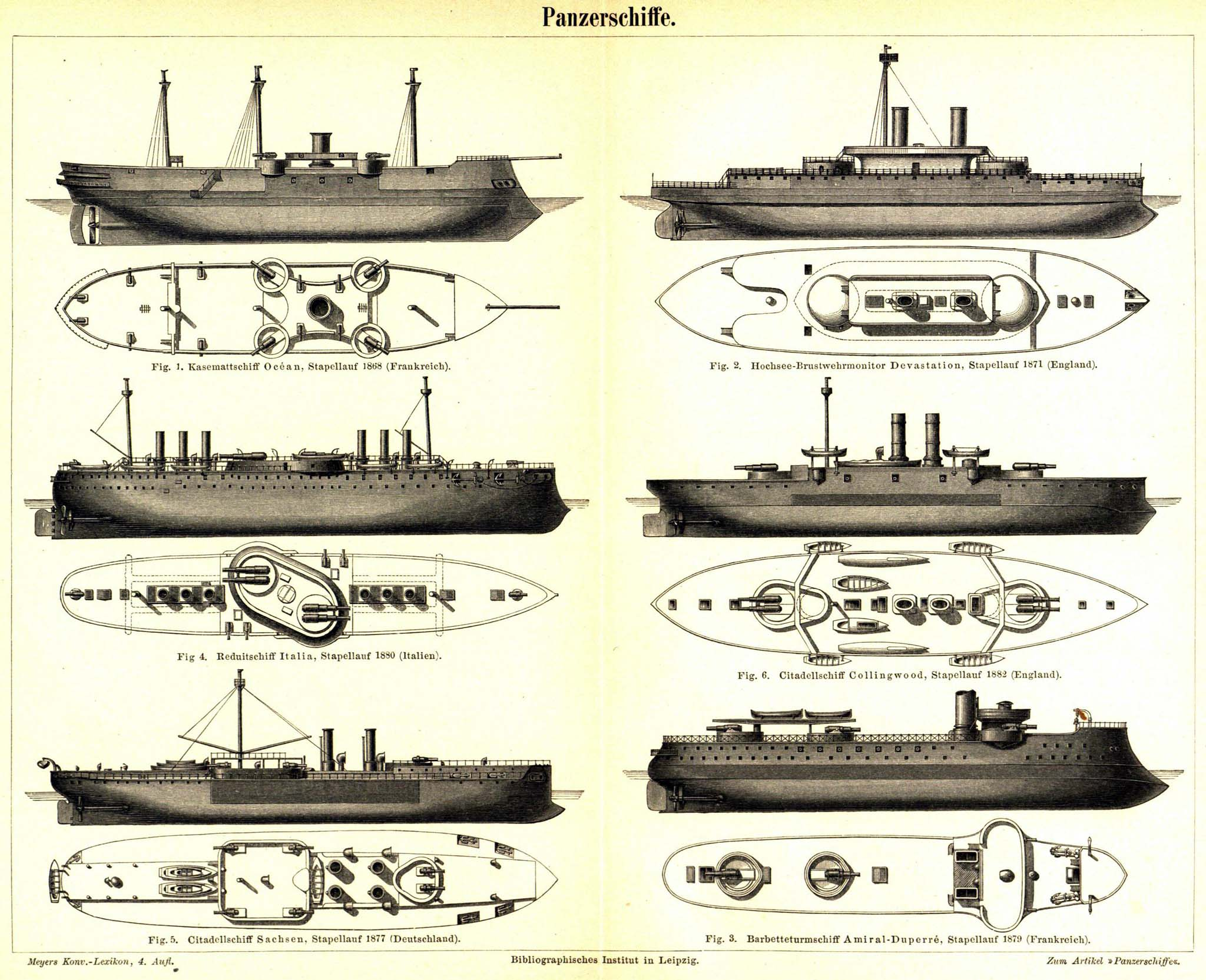
Illustration of several barbette ships from the 1880s, showing the degree of experimentation with armament arrangements

The barbette ship was a type of ironclad warship that was built by several navies between the 1860s and 1890s. The defining characteristic was the use of armored barbettes to partially protect the ship's main battery guns, rather than heavy gun turrets or inflexible box batteries. A large number of these ships were built by many of the world's navies in the 1870s and 1880s, though they began to be replaced by the more modern pre-dreadnought battleship type by the early 1890s.

Barbette ships saw relatively little combat during their time in service, though a small number saw combat in minor actions like the Bombardment of Alexandria in 1882 or the Battle of Fuzhou during the Sino-French War in 1884. More significant use included two Chinese ships at the Battle of the Yalu River during the First Sino-Japanese War in 1894. By the 1910s, barbette ships were obsolete, but a few served on into the 1920s, usually in secondary roles. By the end of the decade, most of these remaining ships had been scrapped.

== Development ==
Following the introduction of ironclad warships in the early 1860s, naval designers grappled with the problem of mounting heavy guns in the most efficient way possible. The first generation of ironclads employed the same broadside arrangement as the old ship of the line, but it was not particularly effective for ahead or stern fire. This was particularly important to designers, since the tactic of ramming was revived following its successful employment at the decisive Austrian victory at the Battle of Lissa in 1866. Ramming required a ship to steam directly at its opponent, which greatly increased the importance of end-on fire. Designers such as Cowper Phipps Coles and John Ericsson designed the first gun turrets in the 1860s, which gave the guns a wide field of fire. These turrets were exceedingly heavy, which required them to be placed low in the ship to reduce top-weight—and produced a dangerous tendency to capsize in heavy seas, amply demonstrated by the loss of HMS Captain and Coles himself with the ship in a gale in 1870.

In the 1870s, designers began to experiment with an en barbette type of mounting. The barbette was a fixed armored enclosure protecting the gun. The barbette could take the form of a circular or elongated ring of armor around the rotating gun mount over which the guns (possibly fitted with a gun shield) fired. The barbette system reduced weight considerably, since the machinery for the rotating gun mount, along with the mount itself, was much lighter than that required for the gun house of a turret. The savings in weight could then be passed on to increase armor protection for the hull, improve coal storage capacity, or to install larger, more powerful engines. In addition, because barbettes were lighter, they could be placed higher in the ship without jeopardizing stability, which improved their ability to be worked in heavy seas that would have otherwise rendered turrets unusable. This also permitted a higher freeboard, which also improved seakeeping.

Ironclads equipped with barbettes were referred to as "barbette ships" much like their contemporaries, turret ships and central battery ships, which mounted their heavy guns in turrets or in a central armored battery. Many navies experimented with all three types in the 1870s and 1880s, including the British Admiral-class battleships, the French Marceau-class ironclads, the Italian Italia-class ironclads, and the German Sachsen-class ironclads, all of which employed barbettes to mount their heavy guns. All of these navies also built turret and or central battery ships during the same period, though none had a decisive advantage over the other. The British and the Russian navies experimented with using disappearing guns afloat, including on the British HMS Temeraire and the Russian ironclad Vice-Admiral Popov. They were not deemed particularly successful and were not repeated.

== Replacement ==
In the late 1880s, the debate between barbette or turret mounts was finally settled. The Royal Sovereign class, mounted their guns in barbettes, but the follow-on design, the Majestic class, adopted a new mounting that combined the benefits of both kinds of mounts. A heavily armored, rotating gun house was added to the revolving platform, which kept the guns and their crews protected. The gun house was smaller and lighter than the old-style turrets, which still permitted placement higher in the ship and the corresponding benefits to stability and seakeeping. This innovation gradually became known simply as a turret, though the armored tube that held the turret substructure, which included the shell and propellant handling rooms and the ammunition hoists, was still referred to as a barbette. These ships were the prototype of the so-called pre-dreadnought battleships, which proved to be broadly influential in all major navies over the next fifteen years.

== Use in service ==
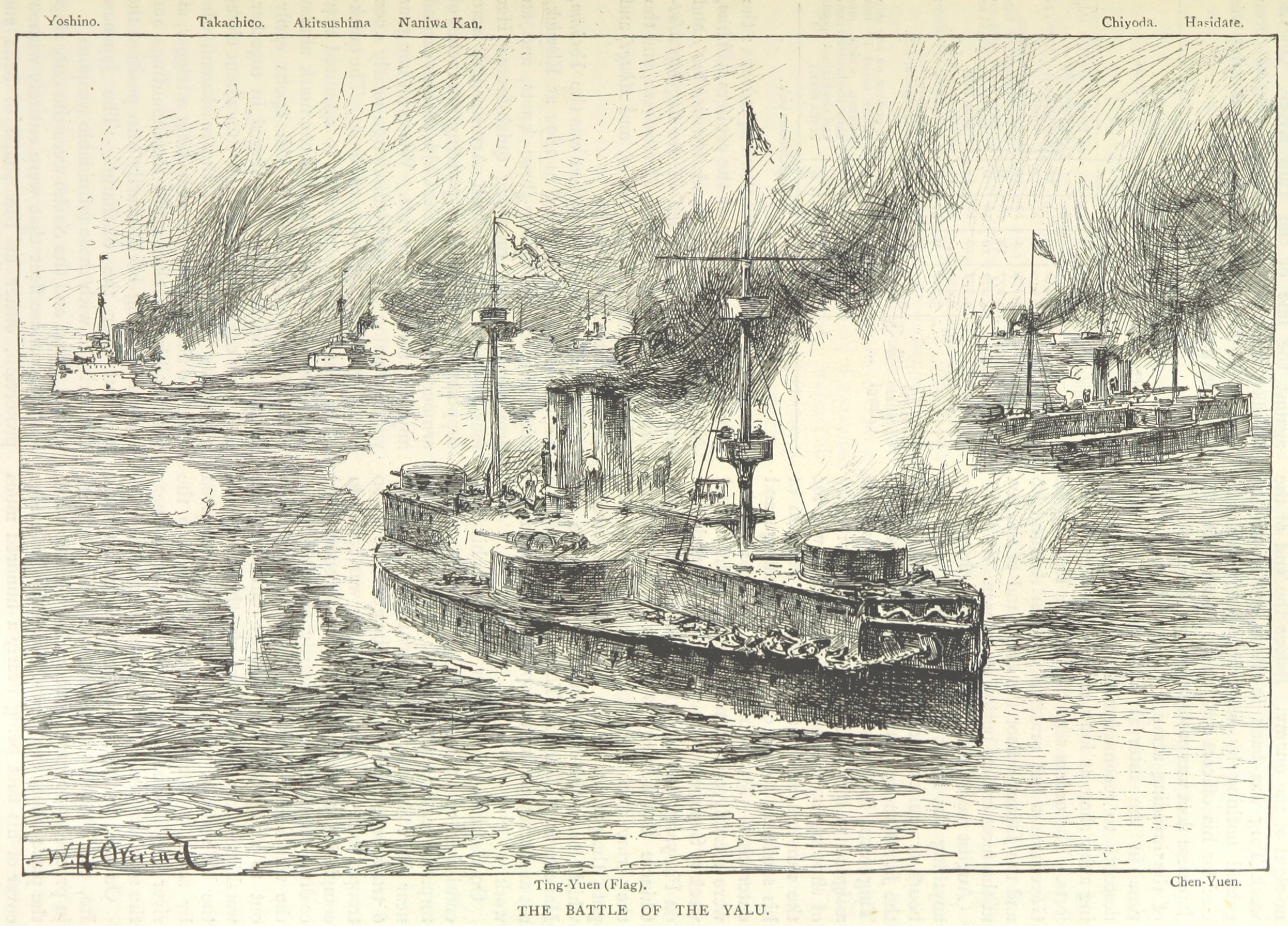
Sketch of Dingyuan and Zhenyuan at the Battle of the Yalu River during the First Sino-Japanese War

Ships equipped with barbette mountings did not see a great deal of combat, owing to the long period of relative peace between their appearance in the 1870s and their obsolescence in the 1890s The Ottoman Navy possessed a number of small barbette ships, which saw combat during the Russo-Turkish War of 1877–1878. Some barbette ships saw action during the British Bombardment of Alexandria in 1882, and the French ironclad Triomphante participated in the Battle of Fuzhou during the Sino-French War in 1884. The two Chinese ironclads, Dingyuan and Zhenyuan, that took part in the Battle of the Yalu River during the First Sino-Japanese War in 1894, carried their main battery in barbettes, though they were equipped with extensive gun shields that resembled turrets. The shields were nevertheless only proof against small-arms fire. Three of their opponents at the Yalu River, the Japanese Matsushima-class cruisers, also mounted their guns in open barbettes. Zhenyuan was seized by Japan during the war and commissioned as Chin Yen, seeing further action during the Russo-Japanese War of 1904–1905.

Most barbette ships were discarded in the 1890s or early 1910s. A pair of Ottoman barbette ships—Iclaliye and Necm-i Şevket—saw limited use providing fire support during the First Balkan War in 1912. Those barbette ships that survived into World War I were typically used only for secondary purposes. For example, the French Marceau was used as a repair ship for submarines and torpedo boats, while the German Württemberg was employed as a torpedo training ship. A handful of barbette ships did see action during the war, including the British Revenge, which bombarded German positions in Flanders in 1914 and 1915. The Italian ship Italia was stationed as a guard ship at Brindisi until 1917, though she saw no action there.

Most of those ships still extant during World War I were quickly broken up in the immediate postwar years; Revenge was sold for scrapping in 1919, Württemberg was broken up in 1920, and Italia was scrapped beginning in late 1921. A handful of French ships, including Dévastation, three of the four Terrible-class ironclads, and Marceau, were discarded in the 1920s. The former Austro-Hungarian barbette ship Kronprinz Erzherzog Rudolf, which had been ceded to the Royal Yugoslav Navy after the war and renamed Kumbor, was retained for a few years as a coastal defense ship, but was scrapped in 1926. The Russian battleship Dvenadsat Apostolov, which had been reduced to secondary duties in 1911, lingered on in the Soviet Navy's inventory until 1931.
