= French ironclad Furieux =

Ironclad warship of the French Navy

- Furieux in her original configuration

Class overview
- Preceded by: Tonnant
- Succeeded by: Jemmapes class

History

France
- Name: Furieux
- Builder: Cherbourg
- Laid down: 15 June 1875
- Launched: 21 July 1883
- Commissioned: 15 February 1890
- Decommissioned: 2 March 1913
- Stricken: 27 November 1913
- Fate: Foundered in Brest, c. 1920

General characteristics
- Type: Coastal defense ship
- Displacement: 5,925 long tons (6,020 t)
- Length: 72.54 m (238 ft) pp
- Beam: 17.83 m (58 ft 6 in)
- Draft: 7.09 m (23 ft 3 in)
- Installed power: 10 × fire-tube boilers; 4,600 indicated horsepower (3,400 kW)
- Propulsion: 2 × compound steam engines; 2 × screw propellers
- Speed: 13 kn (24 km/h; 15 mph)
- Complement: 235
- Armament: 2 × 340 mm (13.4 in) guns; 4 × 47 mm (1.9 in) 3-pounder guns; 10 × 37 mm (1.5 in) 1-pounder Hotchkiss revolver cannon; 2 × 356 mm (14 in) torpedo tubes
- Armor: Belt: 330 to 457 mm (13 to 18 in); Barbettes: 457 mm

General characteristics (1902–1904 refit)
- Displacement: 5,683 long tons (5,774 t)
- Draft: 6.94 m (22 ft 9 in)
- Installed power: 8 × Belleville boilers; 5,145 ihp (3,837 kW)
- Propulsion: 2 × triple-expansion engines; 2 × screw propellers
- Armament: 2 × 240 mm (9.4 in) guns; 16 × 47 mm or 37 mm guns; 2 × 356 mm torpedo tubes
- Armor: Gun turrets: 203 mm (8 in)

Furieux was an ironclad coastal defense ship built for the French Navy in the late 1870s and 1880s. She was ordered under the fleet plan of 1872 that was intended to strengthen the French fleet after the Franco-Prussian War. Originally intended to be similar to the Tonnerre class, Furieux was re-designed after the German Sachsen-class ironclads had begun construction, as the earlier French coastal defense ships were too weak to defeat the Sachsens. Instead of carrying her main armament of two guns in a single gun turret like Tonnerre and other French coastal defense ships, Furieux mounted a pair of guns in two barbettes that allowed her to fire one ahead or astern at any angle. Her guns were significantly larger than the earlier vessels as well, increasing from the 270 mm (10.6 in) guns of her predecessors to 340 mm (13.4 in) weapons. Her design suffered from several problems, including insufficient freeboard and poor stability, both of which reduced her ability to operate in open water. She was also badly overweight, which submerged her belt armor, greatly reducing her defensive characteristics.

Furieux served in the Northern Division (later Squadron) in the English Channel for the duration of her career, the active period of which was brief. She was initially assigned as a guard ship for the port of Cherbourg in 2nd reserve. In 1890, she was commissioned for service with the Northern Division and in early 1891, she embarked on a cruise to Spanish waters with the rest of the division. Later that year, in July and August, the ships made a longer voyage to Russia in anticipation of the signing of the Franco-Russian Alliance in August. She remained in active service through 1895, but saw little activity of note during this period. Throughout the 1890s, the French Navy considered multiple proposals to rebuild the ship to correct her deficiencies, but no work was done until 1902, when she received new, lighter guns, new engines and water-tube boilers, and increased armor protection for her conning tower.

Work was completed by 1904, but she saw little activity afterward apart from sea trials to evaluate the effectiveness of the modifications. She was ultimately struck from the naval register in November 1913. The Navy intended to dismantle the ship in Brest, but the start of World War I in August 1914 interrupted all non-essential work. Some limited scrapping was carried out in 1917 and 1918, but by 1920, when the French government was prepared to sell the ship, it was discovered she had sunk at her mooring. The Navy deemed it too expensive to raise the wreck and so offered her for sale in situ, but after a series of attempts in the 1920s and early 1930s, no firm bought the salvage rights. The wreck appears to still be on the bottom of Brest's harbor.

== Design ==
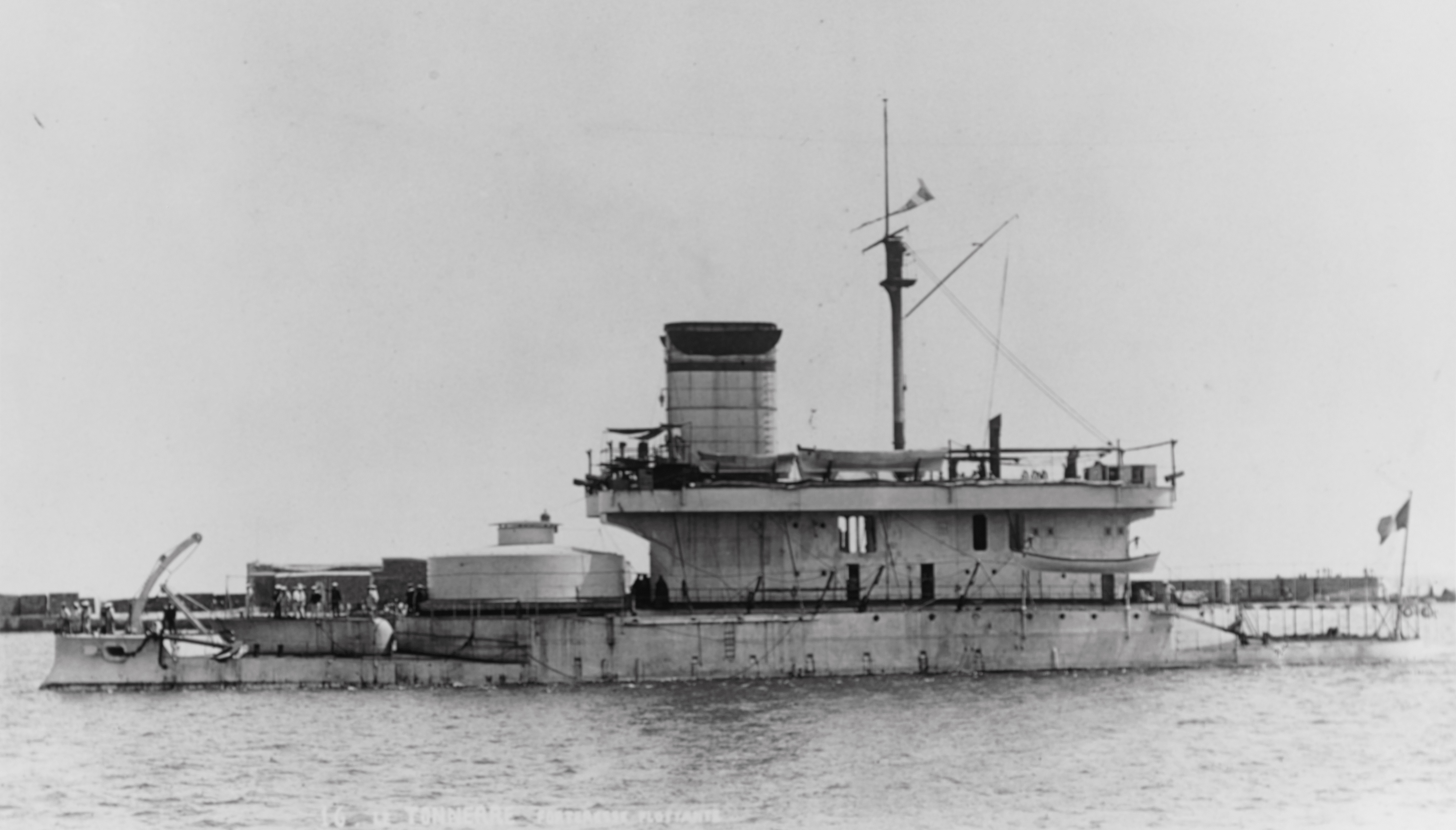
Tonnerre, which provided the basis for Furieux's original design

Furieux was designed in the late 1870s as part of a naval construction program that had begun under the post-Franco-Prussian War fleet plan of 1872. Initially, the French built two types of armored capital ships, the first, a series of high-freeboard barbette ships, and the second being smaller coast defense ships descended from the monitors that had been built in the 1860s. Most of the initial series of coastal defense ships built under the 1872 plan featured a single gun turret with two large-caliber guns toward the bow similar to the breastwork monitors being built in the British Royal Navy at the time. The French ships included the four vessels of the Tonnerre and Tempête classes, which being built simultaneously in the early 1870s and were broadly similar. Their turrets were very large, with the guns widely spaced, to theoretically allow them to fire directly astern, one gun on either side of the superstructure. The Minister of the Navy, Louis Raymond de Montaignac de Chauvance, ordered a fifth vessel on 12 February 1875, to be named Furieux, nearly identical to Tonnerre, though with a slightly longer and narrower hull.

Work on the new ships proceeded slowly, which was common in French shipyards at the time. French capital ship design practices were interrupted by the development of the German Sachsen-class ironclads; these were coastal defense vessels that were significantly more powerful than the French coastal defense ships that had already been built under the 1872 plans, making them obsolete. Moreover, the latest French sea-going capital ships, Amiral Duperré and the Amiral Baudin class, were too large to operate in the relatively shallow waters of the Baltic Sea. In 1876, the French reconsidered the last two coastal defense ships—Furieux and Tonnant—that had been ordered but not yet built under the 1872 plan, since more powerful vessels would be needed to combat the Sachsens.

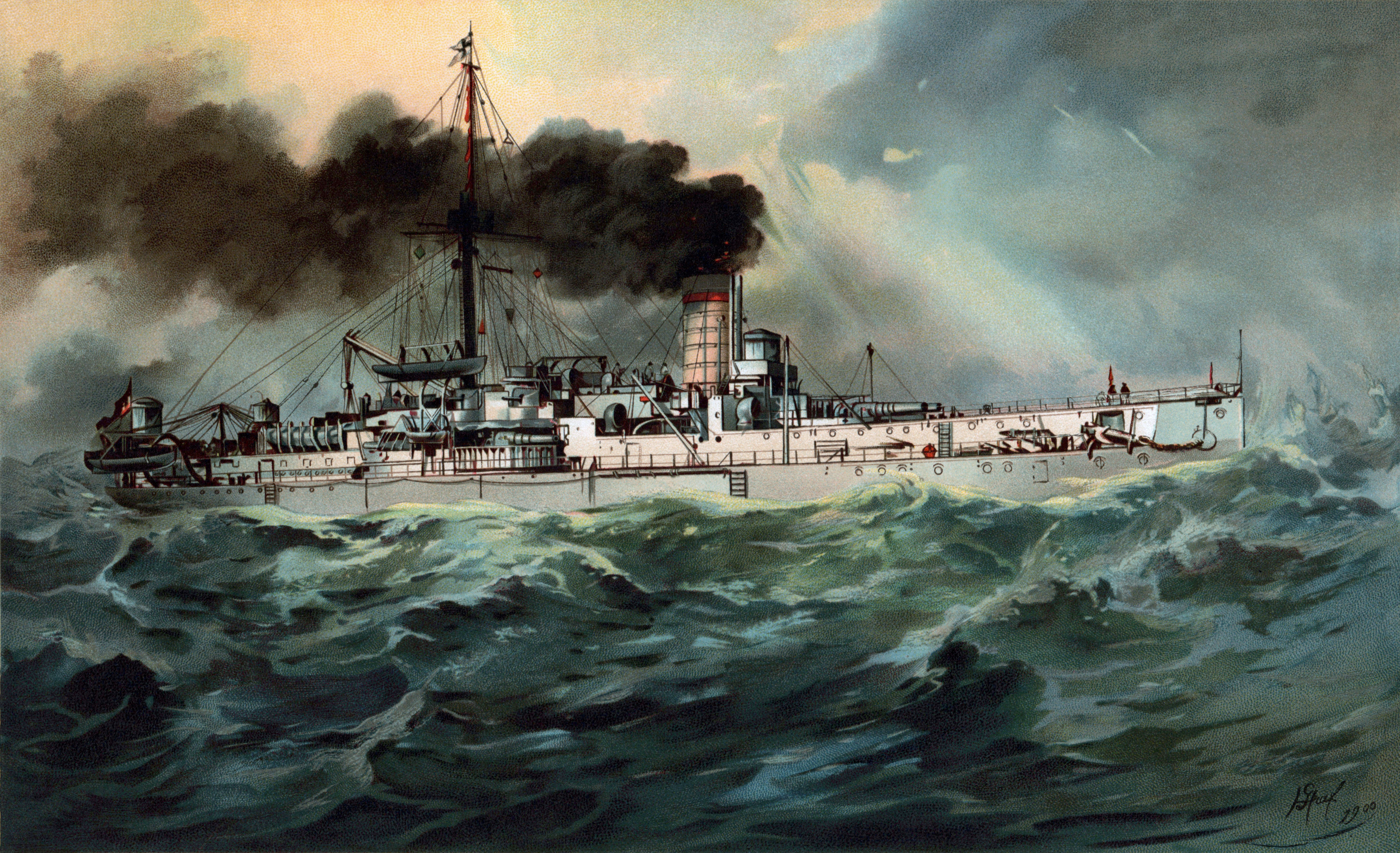
The Sachsen class prompted the re-design of Furieux

At the same time, the naval engineer Carlet designed a new, significantly smaller turret for the new coastal defense ships in July 1877. The turret carried a pair of 320 mm (12.6 in) guns, a major increase in power over the 270 mm (10.6 in) guns of the earlier vessels, and they were arranged closer together, abandoning the concept of direct astern fire, as the blast effects were far too serious to permit it in practice. In December, the design staff decided to abandon the single turret arrangement, opting instead for a pair of single-gun turrets, one forward, and one aft, to preserve the ability to fire at any angle. This led to further changes: the early gun turrets of the time were very heavy, and doubling the number, even at reduced size, would have prohibitively increased the ships' displacement. Instead, barbette mounts were adopted to save weight. In addition, the transfer of the second gun aft required a two-shaft arrangement for the propulsion system, as the propeller shafts would have to be placed on either side of the magazine for the gun.

By shifting the second gun aft and switching to barbette mounts, enough weight was saved to allow the gun caliber to be increased again to 340 mm (13.4 in) and to thicken the belt armor. The French firm Farcot & Sons, which was responsible for supplying the hydraulic gun handling equipment, conducted a pair of studies in March and April 1878 at the request of the Navy. The Conseil des Travaux (Board of Construction) held a meeting on 25 June to consider the alterations to the original design, deeming it to be a significant improvement over the earlier coastal defense ships, though it noted deficiencies in some aspects of the armor layout, including the deck and the conning tower.

=== Characteristics ===
Side and plan view of Furieux showing the arrangement of the main guns and the armor scheme

Furieux was 72.54 m (238 ft) long between perpendiculars, with a beam of 17.83 m (58 ft 6 in) and a draft of 7.09 m (23 ft 3 in). She displaced 5,925 long tons (6,020 t). Since she was intended for coastal operations, the ship had a low freeboard and a short upper deck that supported the main battery guns and conning tower. The ship's construction rendered her prone to severe rolling. Her bow was inverted, with an inward-curving stem. She was fitted with a single pole mast equipped with a spotting top for her main battery guns. The crew consisted of 235 officers and enlisted men.

Her propulsion machinery consisted of two compound steam engines that each drove a single screw propeller. Steam was provided by eight coal-burning fire-tube boilers that were ducted into a single funnel. Her engines were rated to produce 4,600 indicated horsepower (4,700 PS) for a top speed of 13 knots (24 km/h; 15 mph). On sea trials on 21 May 1887, she reached a maximum of 13.95 knots (25.84 km/h; 16.05 mph) from 4,821 ihp (4,888 PS) at forced draft. Coal storage amounted to 285 long tons (290 t).

Her main armament consisted of two 340 mm (13.4 in), 21-caliber guns mounted in individual barbette mounts, one forward and one aft, both on the centerline. Ammunition storage was intended to be eighty rounds per gun, but the need to save weight forced a reduction to forty shots per gun. For defense against torpedo boats, she carried four 47 mm (1.9 in) 3-pounder guns and ten 37 mm (1.5 in) 1-pounder Hotchkiss revolver cannon, all in individual mounts. Her armament was rounded out with two 356 mm (14 in) torpedo tubes in above-water mounts.

The ship was protected with mild steel armor; her belt was 330 to 457 mm (13 to 18 in) thick and extended for the entire length of the hull. She had an armor deck that was 91 mm (3.6 in), connected to the top of the belt armor. The barbettes for the main battery were 457 mm thick and the supporting tubes were 305 mm (12 in). The guns were protected by 15 mm (.6 in) gun shields. As was common to French capital ships of the period, she had little underwater protection, which was revealed during torpedo tests the Navy conducted while Furieux was still under construction; as a result, she was fitted with anti-torpedo nets.

=== Modifications ===
Plan and profile of Furieux after her reconstruction

Furieux received a pair of 65 mm (2.6 in) Modèle 1891 guns in individual mounts during a refit in 1892. She also had the forward and aft sections of her anti-torpedo nets removed at that time as part of an effort to reduce her displacement, as she was by that time 410 long tons (420 t) overweight, and most of her belt was submerged under normal conditions.

Like many French capital ships of the period, Furieux was rebuilt in 1902–1904 in an attempt to extend her useful career. Her old slow-firing guns were replaced with a pair of 240 mm (9.4 in) 40-cal. guns in new gun turrets. The turrets had 203 mm (8 in) thick sides and 152 mm (6 in) bases. A new, armored conning tower was installed with 75 mm sides. She received eight water-tube Belleville boilers in place of her old fire-tube models and a pair of vertical triple-expansion steam engines were installed. Her new boilers were ducted into a pair of funnels. Her new propulsion system was rated for 5,145 ihp (3,837 kW) for a top speed of 14.3 knots (26.5 km/h; 16.5 mph). Her original pole mast was replaced with a heavier military mast and a pole fore mast was installed. The changes reduced her displacement to 5,683 long tons (5,774 t) and her draft to 6.94 m (22 ft 9 in).

Furieux received a wireless telegraph set in between April and June 1908, along with a tall mast carry an antenna for it. At some point, late in her career, her funnel caps were extended to reduce smoke interference. The naval historian Luc Feron believes it may have been during the 1908 refit that this work was done.

== Service history ==
=== Construction ===
The keel for Furieux was laid down on 15 June 1875 in Cherbourg and her completed hull was launched on 21 July 1883. Her belt armor plates were installed over the course of the year and into early 1884. As fitting-out work continued, it became apparent that the ship was becoming overweight; by May 1885, the ship was already 320 long tons (325 t) over her designed displacement. This led the Conseil de Traveaux to make several alterations on 20 October, including reducing the thickness of some armor plates, halving the number of shells carried per main gun, and eliminating spare parts carried aboard the ship, since as a coastal defense vessel, she was not expected to travel far from her home port. The shipyard accordingly issued a revised design, which the Conseil approved on 14 January 1886. Over the next year, additional alterations were made, including the decision to install electric lighting on 2 March 1886 and anti-torpedo nets on 7 February 1887. Furieux was commissioned for sea trials on 10 November 1886, though she did not begin evaluations until 19 March 1887. Trials continued through late May, which revealed significant blast effects from the main gun and problems with the placement of the torpedo tubes, but these could not be corrected.

=== Active career ===
==== 1887–1892 ====
Furieux was placed in 2nd category reserve on 1 July 1887, part of the harbor defenses of Cherbourg along with Tonnant. She saw little activity until 6 June 1888, when she departed for a cruise to Quiberon Bay, returning to Cherbourg on 1 July, where she was again reduced to reserve status. That year, she took part in a mobilization exercise and it took her crew eight days to prepare Furieux for operations. She was placed in unclassified reserve on 3 November to have alterations made to her main battery gun equipment. Work was completed on 25 February 1889 and the ship was returned to 2nd category reserve. She was commissioned on 15 February 1890 and was assigned to the Northern Division days later. At that time, the unit consisted of the ironclads Marengo, Océan, and Suffren and the torpedo cruiser Epervier. The ships embarked on a tour of ports in Brittany over the next several months. They took part in the 1890 fleet maneuvers held in Brest in conjunction with the Mediterranean Squadron. The exercises began on 6 July and concluded on 25 July. Furieux later took part in a fleet review in Quiberon Bay in September. She ended the year with periodic maintenance, being dry docked on 6 December.

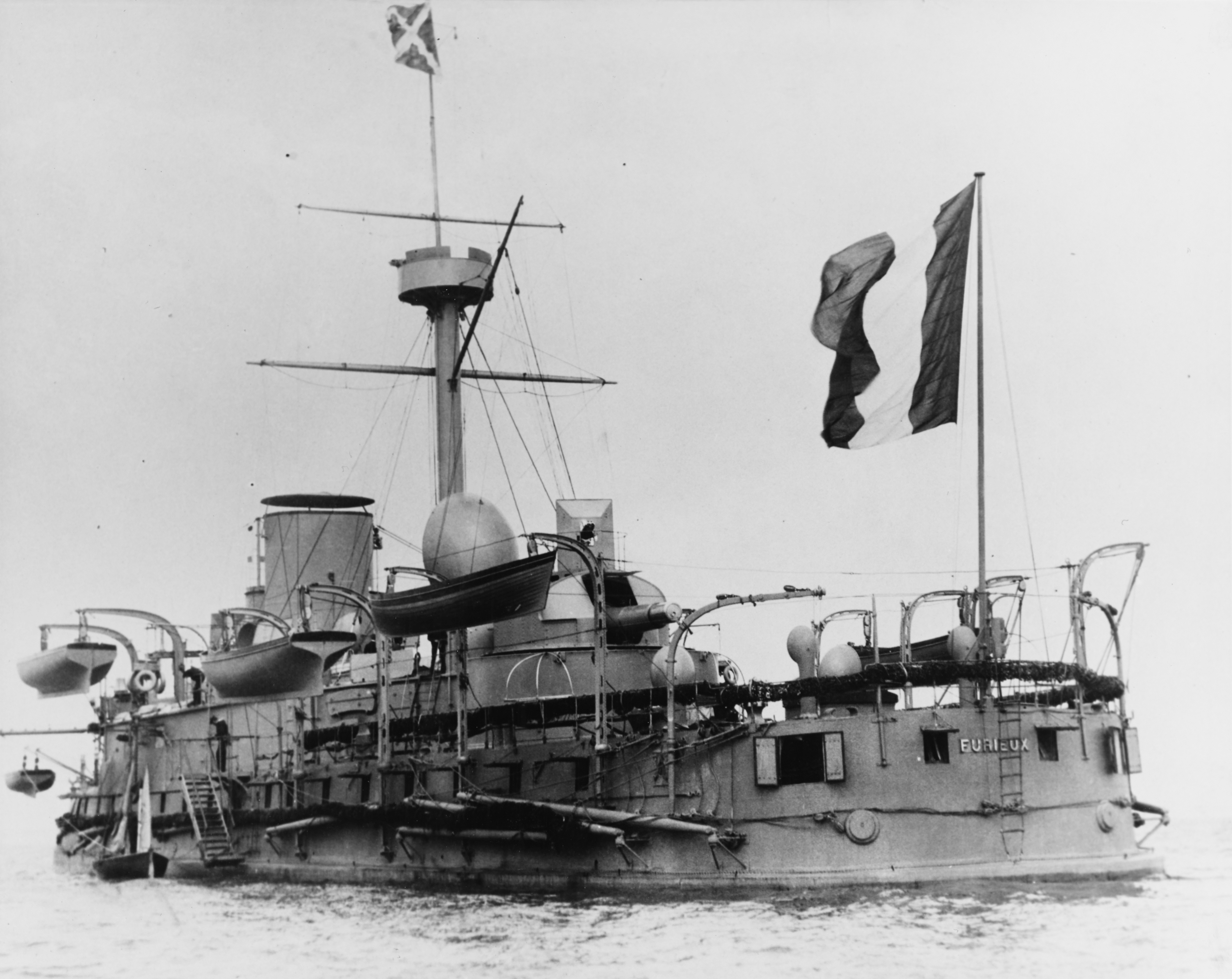
Furieux in Portsmouth in 1891

She returned to service in early January 1891 and took part in limited training cruises in the area before sailing for Brest, where she joined the rest of the squadron on 23 January. The ships then conducted a longer cruise south, visiting the ports of Lisbon, Portugal, Ferrol, Vigo, Villagarcia, and Cádiz, Spain, and Tangiers, French Algeria. The ships arrived back in Quiberon Bay at the end of February. The squadron was reorganized in June, losing Suffren and Océan but gaining the ironclad Requin and the cruiser Surcouf. On 14 May 1891, Capitaine de vaisseau (Captain) Auguste de Penfentenyo took command of the ship. Furieux embarked on another tour of northern French ports from 26 May to 8 June, this time major cities in the English Channel, including Le Havre, Dieppe, Boulogne, Calais, and Dunkirk. During that period, the ironclad Marceau joined the squadron. The major ships of the squadron embarked on a cruise to visit Russia on 19 June to mark the signing of the Franco-Russian Alliance, which was to occur on 27 August. On the way, the ships visited a number of foreign ports, including Bergen and Larvik, Norway, Copenhagen, Denmark, and Stockholm, Sweden, before arriving in Kronstadt, Russia on 23 July. On the voyage back, which began on 4 August, the ships stopped in Finland and Norway before calling in Portsmouth, where Queen Victoria reviewed the ships. They reached Cherbourg on 27 August.

Furieux then cruised individually to Bénodet, Quiberon Bay, Brest, and Camaret-sur-Mer between 4 September and 1 November. She then sailed to Cherbourg, where she was dry docked on 4 November for maintenance that lasted until 16 December. The Northern Division was reorganized as the Northern Squadron in early 1892, by which time Marceau had been sent to the Mediterranean Squadron. The Northern Squadron received the coastal defense ships Tonnerre and Fulminant and the old armored frigate Victorieuse. The ships of the squadron conducted exercises in January and February, including shooting practice on 12 February. Furieux steamed to Brest for another maintenance period on 12 April, and while entering the port, her port screw was damaged when it struck the base of the Fer à cheval fortification, part of the Château de Brest. Repairs lasted until 2 May and the ship returned to Cherbourg the next day, though her screw was not repaired at that time. She participated in maneuvers with a group of torpedo boats on 28 June. She visited Brest and Quiberon Bay from 3 to 26 September, and in November, she conducted tests with mixed oil and coal fuel for her boilers. The test demonstrated that the mixture was much more efficient and made it easier to get steam pressure up in the boilers. She returned to the dry dock on 18 November to have her screw repaired, along with other modifications.

==== 1893–1901 ====
Furieux emerged from the shipyard on 2 January 1893 and conducted a series of local cruises through February and most of March. On 28 March, she departed Cherbourg and moved to Brest, where she met the rest of the Northern Squadron. The ships got underway on 22 April for another visit to Spanish waters that concluded on 25 May with their return to Brest. Penfentenyo left the ship on 1 June, and at his departure, he wrote a report highlighting defects with the ship and making recommendations to remedy them. These included replacing the 340 mm guns with 270 mm weapons. The Conseil des Traveaux accepted his report and decided that significant alterations should be made, including removing the torpedo tubes, two of the 37 mm guns, and the rest of her torpedo nets to save enough weight to strengthen the armor of the conning tower. But despite reaching this conclusion, no work was actually done. From 20 to 28 July, Furieux participated in squadron exercises in the English Channel. Over the next several years, the Navy considered a series of other options, including removing parts of the armor plate, to save enough weight to make the necessary improvements, but as with Penfentenyo's proposals, they came to nothing.

She remained in the Northern Squadron through 1895, which was kept in commission for four months of the year. By that time, the unit consisted of Furieux, Requin, Victorieuse, and the ironclad Suffren. Later that year, the new coastal defense ship Jemmapes had entered service, taking Furieux's place in the squadron. She remained out of service as part of the reserve fleet through 1897. By that time, the various reconstruction proposals had begun to mature, and in September 1897, plans were drawn up to replace the main battery with 240 mm guns and install new boilers, among other changes. Tenders for the boilers were solicited in June 1898 and Belleville models were selected, to be manufactured by Indret. The contract for the new main gun turrets was awarded to Saint Chamond on 26 April 1899.

=== Reconstruction and later career ===
Work finally began in July 1902 with the installation of the new boilers, which was completed by March 1904, when initial trials were conducted while still in dry dock on the 29th and 30th. She was removed from the dry dock on 2 May, recommissioned, and began sea trials on 24 May. Testing continued into January 1905, and trials of the new guns during that period revealed defects that required corrections from Saint Chamond. She was reduced to the reserve on 1 January 1906, remaining out of service through 20 February 1907, when she was recommissioned briefly for another round of trials that lasted until April. Again placed in normal reserve, she was reduced to special reserve on 10 August 1909. She was reactivated to be transferred from Cherbourg to Brest on 15 and 16 September, before being placed in reserve once again. Furieux was designated the support ship for the 1st Atlantic Torpedo-boat Flotilla on 1 January 1910. She returned to reserve status again on 10 April 1912 and was decommissioned for the final time on 2 March 1913.

Furieux as a hulk during World War I

Furieux was condemned on 29 July 1913 and was struck from the naval register on 27 November. The ship was slated for disposal when on 31 January 1914, the Navy decided to salvage the boilers, as they had not seen much use, so they could be sold. No work had begun on the project by the time World War I broke out in August, and all work in the shipyard that was not essential for the war effort was halted. The Navy decided on 8 December 1916 to use the ship in explosives tests, but no records of the tests, or whether they were even carried out, have been found in the French naval archives. The government instructed the shipyard in Brest to begin dismantling Furieux on 5 November 1917, but again, no work was carried out at that time. Over the course of the next six months, easily removable equipment, including bronze piping, valves, and bearings were salvaged from the ship, but on 4 April 1918, the government ordered the shipyard to stop work.

The ship breaking firm Jobson & Sons offered to buy Furieux and the old pre-dreadnought battleship Charles Martel on 7 December 1920, but the government deemed their offer of 30,000 francs to be too low. By that time, Furieux had sunk at her moorings, while Charles Martel was leaking; the latter was towed off to be patched and sold, while Furieux remained on the harbor bottom. Plans to raise the wreck were too expensive, so she was offered for sale in situ on 26 April 1921. No bids were received until 26 December 1923, when the ship breakers Muzio-Olivi & Caselli, from Marseille, offered to buy the wreck with certain requirements, but the government declined. The wreck was finally sold on 3 July 1924 for 1,000 francs to a salvage company that did no work on the vessel. The government once again tried to sell Furieux in an auction on 3 October 1930, which once again failed to solicit a buyer. Feron believes that "the hull therefore seems to have remained where it had sunk...its present condition is unknown." The naval historian Stephen Roberts agrees, noting that Admiralty charts note the location of the wreck, the condition of which also describes as unknown.
