= French ship Tempête =

At least two ships of the French Navy have been named Tempête:

- French ironclad Tempête, a Tempête-class ironclad launched in 1876 and expended as a target in 1909.
- French destroyer Tempête, a Bourrasque-class destroyer launched in 1925 and scrapped in 1950.
