= French ironclad Vengeur =

Coastal defense battleship of the French Navy

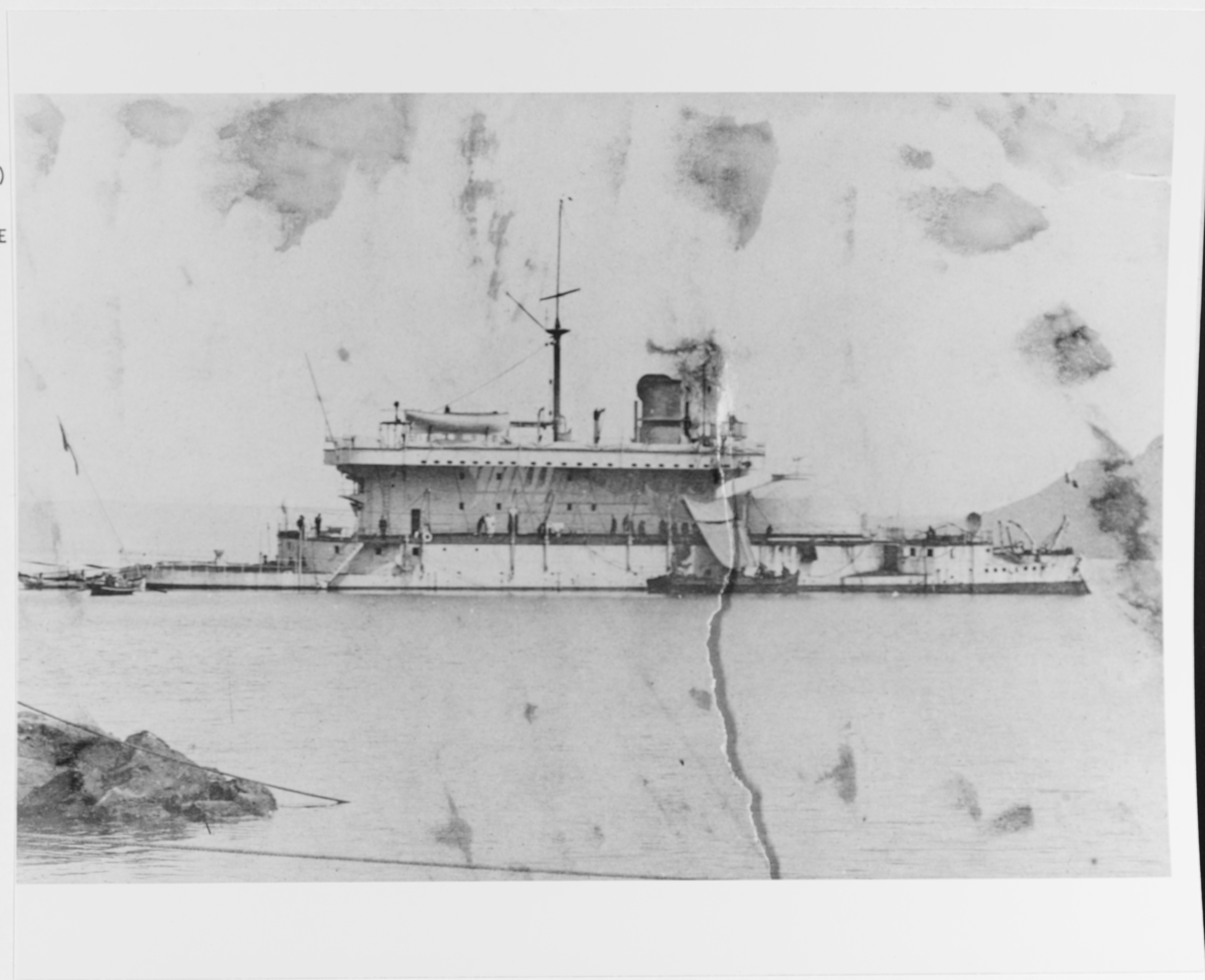
- Vengeur photographed while taking coal aboard from lighter moored to starboard

History

France
- Name: Vengeur
- Builder: Arsenal, Brest
- Laid down: 1 December 1874
- Launched: 16 May 1878
- Commissioned: 15 January 1882
- Stricken: 20 June 1906
- Fate: Sold to be broken up

General characteristics
- Class & type: Tempête class coastal defense ship
- Displacement: 4,635 long tons (4,709 t)
- Length: 78.6 m (257 ft 10 in) (o/a)
- Beam: 17.6 m (57 ft 9 in)
- Draft: 5.42 m (17.8 ft)
- Installed power: 2 × marine boilers; 1,754 ihp (1,308 kW)
- Propulsion: 1 shaft, 3 compound steam engine
- Speed: 10 kn (19 km/h; 12 mph)
- Complement: 174
- Armament: 1 × twin 340 mm (13 in) guns; 4 × single 100 mm (3.9 in) guns
- Armor: Belt: 250–340 mm (9.8–13.4 in); Deck: 50 mm (2 in); Conning tower: 250 mm (9.8 in); Turrets: 300 mm (11.8 in)

Vengeur was the second of two Tempête-class ironclad coastal defence ships served in the French Navy (Marine Nationale) in the nineteenth century. Launched in 1878, the vessel was armed with two 340 mm (13 in) mounted in a single turret that was protected with armor that was 300 mm (11.8 in) thick as well as having an armored Belt between 250 and 340 mm (9.8 and 13.4 in) thick. The ship had a generally uneventful career, spending most of her career in reserve, except a year as part of the Escadre d'evolutions between 1884 and 1885, where she served alongside the faster and deeper-draft ironclad Tonnerre, and 1889, where she participated in a military exercise, successfully defending Cherbourg alongside fellow ironclad Tonnant. In 1906, the ship was struck and sold to be broken up.

== Design and description ==
'The Tempête class coastal defense ships were developed as a shallower-draught and slower complement to the Tonnerre class. Designed by the Naval architects Louis de Bussy to a specification issued on 10 November 1871 and inspired by the breastwork monitor Glatton, the class consisted of two vessels. Vengeur was the second of the class. The design was approved by the Minister of the Navy, Louis Pierre Alexis Pothuau, on 19 August 1872. The vessel was considered to be a coast guard vessel.

The Tempête-class coast-defense ships had a length of 78.6 m (257 ft 10 in) overall, 75.57 m (247.9 ft) at the waterline and 73.57 m (241.4 ft) between perpendiculars. Beam was 17.6 m (57 ft 9 in) and mean draft was 5.414 m (17 ft 9.1 in). Vengeur displaced 4,635 long tons (4,709 t) at deep load. The ship's complement numbered 174 of all ranks.

Power for Vengeur was provided by three two-cylinder, horizontal compound-expansion steam engines that drove one propeller shaft using steam provided by four high return flame Indret cylindrical marine boilers. The engine was designed by Joseph Joessel. It vented through a single funnel, cited forward of the single mast. Rated at 1,754 indicated horsepower (1,308 kW) at a boiler pressure of 4.133 kg/cm^{2} (58.79 psi), it was intended to give the ships a top speed of 10 knots (19 km/h; 12 mph). The ship carried 164.4 t (161.8 long tons; 181.2 short tons) of coal. Vengeur achieved 10.76 knots (19.93 km/h; 12.38 mph) in trials and was rated at 10.8 knots (20.0 km/h; 12.4 mph) in service.

Vengeur was originally designed to be primarily armed with a ram, but the addition of turret-mounted guns offered greater capability with increased complexity and cost. As built, the ship carried a main battery of two 340 mm (13.4 in) 18 calibre Modèle 1875 guns in a single twin turret with a secondary armament of four 100 mm (3.9 in) guns. In 1900, the latter was replaced by six single 47 mm (1.9 in) guns and six single 37 mm (1.5 in) guns, positioned on the hurricane deck. The ship was also equipped with three 60 cm (24 in) searchlights.

Vengeur had a full-length waterline armour belt that tapered from the maximum thickness of 340 mm (13 in) amidships to 250 mm (10 in) forward and 300 mm (12 in) aft. The belt was designed to stretch from 1.2 mm (0 in) below the waterline to 0.8 mm (0 in) above, but, in service, it ranged from 1.114 m (44 in) below the waterline to 0.886 m (35 in) above. This was complemented by a breastwork that was equipped with armour that was 333 mm (13 in) thick forward and 300 mm (12 in) thick in the middle. The turret armour was 300 mm (12 in) thick, the turret being surmounted by a cylindrical conning tower that had armour 250 mm (10 in) in thickness. The deck armour was 50 mm (2.0 in) thick amidships while the ends were armoured by a combination of 10 mm (0.39 in) iron on 120 mm (4.7 in) of teak.

== Construction and career ==
Ordered in January 1874 from the arsenal at Brest, Vengeur was laid down on 8 December, and launched at the shipyard in the city on 16 May 1878. The ship's machinery was installed between 11 April and December 1882. Initially commissioned for trials on 15 January 1882 and fully commissioned on 30 May that year, the vessel had a generally uneventful career. Having been moved to Toulon from Brest, Vengeur arrived on 11 July and was placed in reserve before joining the Escadre d'evolutions at Toulon in 1884. The ship served alongside the ironclad Tonnerre. On 14 April, the vessel was travelling between Toulon and Villefranche along a battle squadron that included nine ironclads, two avisos and two torpedo boats when the flotilla was struck by a storm. Tonnerre, Vengeur and the avisos were incapable of completing the journey and had to return to base, with two of the boats aboard Vengeur damaged by the waves.

After serving with the squadron until 25 March 1885, the vessel was moved to Cherbourg to be placed back in reserve. On 17 June 1889, the recommissioned vessel and joined a military exercise off the north coast of France. Vengeur, along with fellow coastal defense ship Tonnant and a flotilla of smaller ships including torpedo boats, formed a force under Rear admiral Jacques Ferdinand Planche tasked with defending Cherbourg. On 2 July, the defending fleet engaged with a more powerful attacking force of ironclads from the Channel Squadron (Escadre du Canal), although the larger ships remained at a distance while the torpedo boats attacked. Two days later, when the attackers returned, Tonnant and Vengeur responded with heavy fire. The attackers were repelled and sailed away. The vessel returned to reserve. Struck on 20 June 1906, the ship was sold by the end of the year while still at Cherbourg to be broken up.
