= French ironclad Tonnant =

Coastal defense battleship of the French Navy

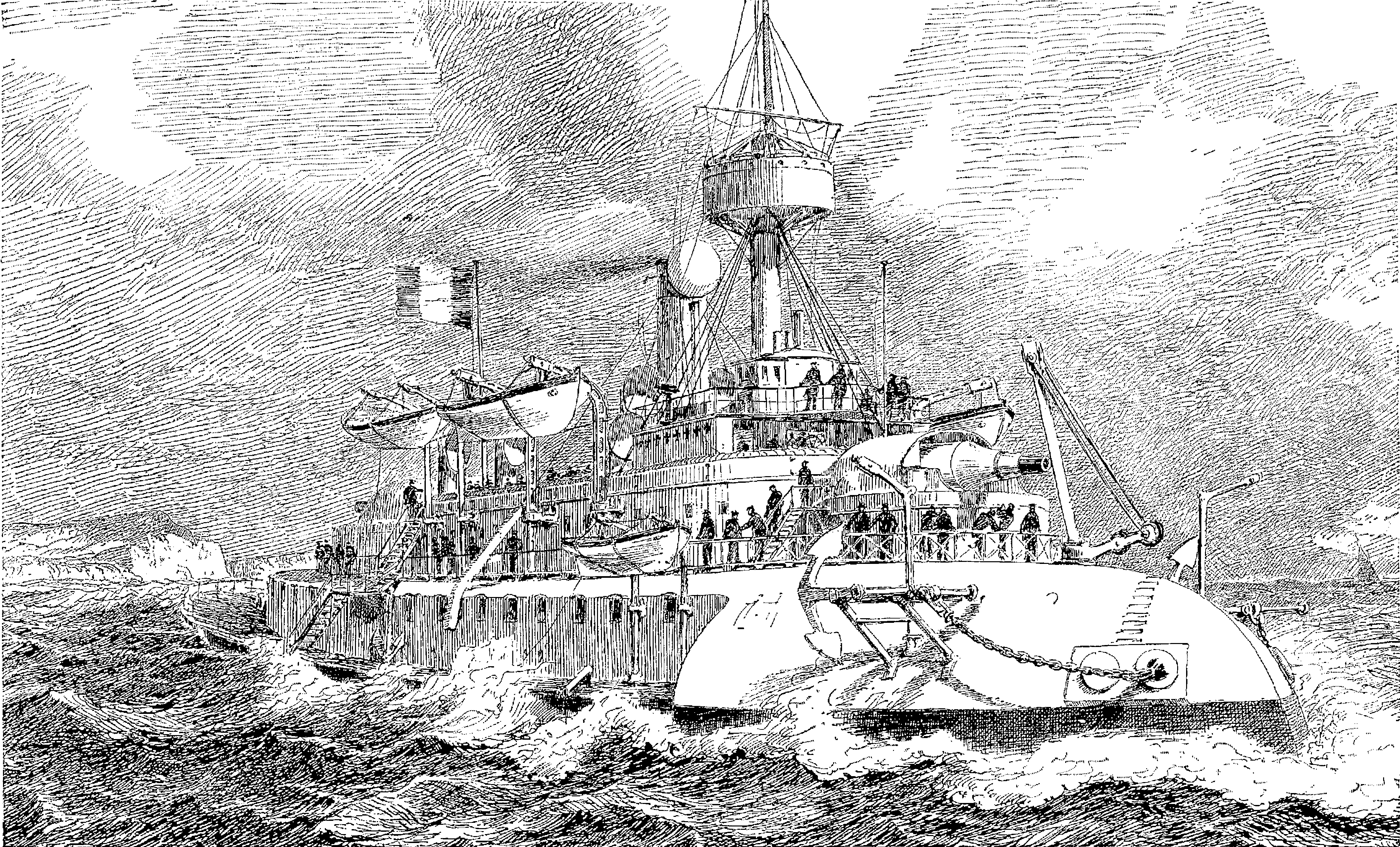
- Tonnant as illustrated in Les Merveilles de la Science, 1891

History

France
- Name: Tonnant
- Builder: Rochefort Arsenal, Rochefort
- Laid down: 12 February 1875
- Launched: 16 October 1880
- Commissioned: 3 August 1885
- Decommissioned: 1 September 1902
- Stricken: 24 October 1902
- Fate: Sold to be broken up, 2 April 1905

Class overview
- Preceded by: Tempête class
- Succeeded by: Furieux

General characteristics
- Class & type: Tonnant class coastal defense ship
- Displacement: 5,091.3 t (5,010.9 long tons)
- Length: 78.6 m (257 ft 10 in) (o/a)
- Beam: 17.72 m (58 ft 2 in)
- Draft: 5.636 m (18.49 ft)
- Installed power: 4 × Belleville boilers; 1,700 ihp (1,300 kW)
- Propulsion: 1 shaft, 1 compound steam engine
- Speed: 10 kn (19 km/h; 12 mph)
- Complement: 163
- Armament: 2 × single 340 mm (13.4 in) guns; 4 × single 37 mm (1.5 in) Hotchkiss revolver cannon
- Armor: Belt: 340–450 mm (13.4–17.7 in); Deck: 80 mm (3.1 in); Conning tower: 30 mm (1.2 in); Barbettes: 340 mm (13.4 in)

Tonnant was a coastal defense ship built for the French Navy (Marine Nationale) that served during the last two decades of the nineteenth century. Initially envisaged to mount two 340 mm (13.4 in) guns in a single turret, the design was redone with the guns mounted in two barbette turrets. The vessel pioneered the naval use of the electricity, the power source being used to drive the turrets. Launched in 1880, Tonnant was initially commissioned in reserve and was only intermittently placed into active service. The vessel did not participate in any conflicts. However, in 1889, Tonnant formed part of the force that successfully defended Cherbourg in a naval exercise against the more powerful ironclads of the Channel Squadron (Escadre du Canal). The main armament was removed to be upgraded in 1901 but was not replaced. Instead, the ship was decommissioned in 1902 and was sold in 1905 to be broken up.

== Design and development ==
From the 1870s, the French Navy (Marine Nationale) developed a smaller ironclad to complement seagoing battleships but more suited to coastal defence, having a lower speed and less endurance. Although less maneuverable than their larger peers, they were heavily armed, able to strike with guns, torpedoes and a ram. Following the French defeat in the Franco-Prussian War and the emergence of the Jeune École doctrine, these matured as the Tempête class of ironclad coastal defense ships. Originally ordered in January 1875 as the third member of the class, Tonnant was designed by the naval architects Louis de Bussy and Émile Marchegay. However, soon after the ship was laid down, the Minister of the Navy (Ministère de la Marine) Louis Raymond de Montaignac de Chauvance asked for the design to be amended to have greater protection on its deck and less on its breastwork alongside increased speed, all without increasing the displacement.

The Council of the Navy responded with a new specification for Tonnant. On 10 March 1876, a new specification was created with two 340 mm guns in a single turret 7.3 m (24.0 ft) in diameter. Deck armor was increased to 80 mm (3.1 in), a new unarmored deck was added and the breastwork suppressed. Marchegay completed the design for Tonnant on 8 June 1877. In response to changes in the layout of the related Furieux, the design was altered to incorporate two barbettes for the guns and belt armor increased from 350 mm (13.8 in) to 450 mm (17.7 in). This was submitted to the Board of Construction (Conseil de travaux) on 31 August 1878 and approved by the Minister of the Navy on 24 September. The barbette armor was reduced from 450 mm to 400 mm (15.7 in) on 12 April 1880.

Tonnant was built as a barbette ship with a low-freeboard hull that was turtle-backed forward and had a built-up superstructure. The design had features of the Bélier class, including the low stern of a monitor turret ship. The ship had an overall length of 78.6 m (257 ft 10 in), 75.85 m (248 ft 10 in) at the waterline and 73.85 m (242 ft 3 in) between perpendiculars, a beam of 17.72 m (58 ft 2 in) at the waterline and a mean draught of 5.636 m (18.49 ft). The vessel displaced 5,091.3 metric tons (5,010.9 long tons) and had a ship's complement that numbered 163 sailors of all ranks.

Tonnant was powered by a single horizontal compound steam engine with return connecting rods. The engine had three cylinders, a high-pressure cylinder 1.36 m (4 ft 6 in) in bore and 0.5 m (1 ft 8 in) in stroke flanked by two low-pressure cylinders with a 0.3 m (1 ft 0 in) stroke. It drove a single propeller shaft. Steam was provided by four boilers running at a pressure of 4.132 kg/cm^{2} (58.77 psi) The engine was rated at 1,700 indicated horsepower (1,300 kW) at 95rpm. The ship carried 165 tonnes (162 long tons; 182 short tons) of coal. While undertaking sea trials, Tonnant reached a speed of 11.561 knots (21.4 km/h; 13.3 mph) from 1,994.04 ihp (1,486.96 kW). In service, the ship was rated at 10 knots (19 km/h; 12 mph).

Tonnant carried a main battery of two 340 mm 18 caliber Modèle 1875 guns in two single-gun barbette turrets, one forward of the superstructure and the other aft. They were mounted on a deck above the hull proper. Defence from torpedo boats was provided by four 37 mm (1.5 in) Hotchkiss revolving cannon. An additional four 37 mm guns were fitted in 1889, then four were removed and replaced by four Canon de 47 mm (1.9 in) Modèle 1885 Hotchkiss guns in 1898. The ship was equipped with a 2.75 m (9 ft) ram. Two torpedo tubes were proposed in 1886 but not fitted, as were two 40 cm (16 in) Mangin searchlights in 1888. The ship was an early naval use of electricity, used to drive the gun platforms.

The ship had a full-length waterline armor belt that tapered from the maximum thickness of 450 mm amidships to 340 mm forward and aft. The belt stretched from 1.74 m (69 in) below the waterline to 0.26 m (10 in) above. The guns were protected by barbettes that were 340 mm thick while the armor protecting the cylindrical conning tower measured 30 mm (1.2 in) in thickness. The deck armor was 80 mm (3.1 in) thick.

== Construction and career ==
Ordered in January 1875 from the Rochefort Arsenal in Rochefort, Charente-Maritime, Tonnant was laid down on 12 February, and launched on 16 October 1880. The ship's machinery was installed between 11 April and December 1882. Initially commissioned for trials on 1 January 1885, Tonnant sailed to Cherbourg between 15 and 17 March, escorted by the aviso Travailleur. Commissioned into reserve on 3 August, the ship was moved to Toulon the day after, being fully commissioned on 23 March the following year. The ship was reported as being 247 metric tons (243 long tons) overweight, mainly due to the engines and boilers. Active service was short and the vessel returned to Cherbourg to rejoin the reserve fleet on 2 April 1886.

On 17 June 1889, the vessel was commissioned to join a military exercise off the north coast of France. Tonnant, along with fellow coastal defense ship Vengeur and a flotilla of smaller ships including torpedo boats, formed a force under Rear admiral Jacques Ferdinand Planche tasked with defending Cherbourg. On 2 July, the defending fleet engaged with a more powerful attacking force of ironclads from the Channel Squadron (Escadre du Canal), although the larger ships remained at a distance while the torpedo boats attacked. Two days later, when the attackers returned, Tonnant and Vengeur responded with heavy fire. The attackers were repelled and sailed away. On 22 and 23 July, Tonnant accompanied her fellow coastal defense ship Tempête, along with more torpedo boats, sailed from Brest to defend Cherbourg once more. As before, the attackers were repulsed.

On 1 January 1890, Tonnant was decommissioned and placed back into reserve. The vessel was briefly recommissioned on 10 July 1893 to run trials but returned to reserve on 5 August. The ship's turret mechanism was subsequently updated and, on 29 November 1894, tested during sea trials. In July 1901 the main armament was removed for modification at Ruelle but were not replaced. On 3 April 1902 the ship's boilers were found to be unsafe operating above 2.25 kg/cm^{2} (32.0 psi), which was reported to the Minister of the Navy Camille Pelletan who, on 31 July, ordered the ship decommissioned. This was accomplished on 1 September and the ship was struck on 24 October, being sold on 2 April 1905 to be broken up.
