= Tonnerre-class ironclad =

Coastal-defense ship class of the French Navy

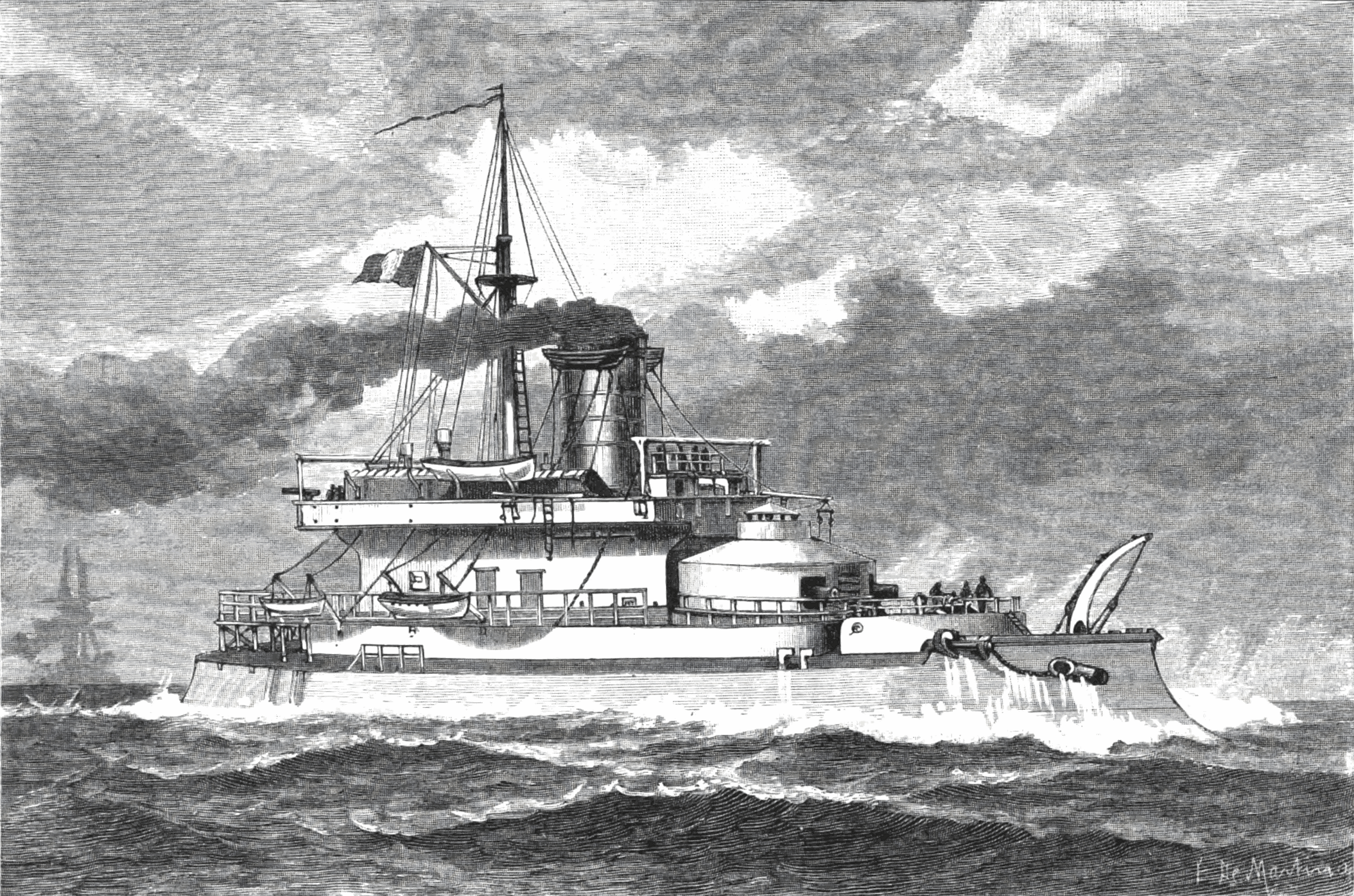
- Tonnerre

Class overview
- Name: Tonnerre class
- Operators: French Navy
- Preceded by: Bélier-class
- Succeeded by: Tempête-class
- Built: 1873–1877
- In service: 1878–1905
- Completed: 2
- Retired: 2

General characteristics
- Displacement: 5,588 t (5,500 long tons)
- Length: 78.6 m (257 ft 10 in) (o/a)
- Beam: 17.6 m (57 ft 9 in)
- Draught: 6.421 m (21 ft 0.8 in) (mean)
- Installed power: 8 × boilers; 3,400–3,500 ihp (2,500–2,600 kW)
- Propulsion: 1 shaft, 1 steam engine
- Speed: 14 kn (26 km/h; 16 mph)
- Range: 2,070–2,100 nmi (3,830–3,890 km; 2,380–2,420 mi) at 10 kn (19 km/h; 12 mph)
- Complement: 190
- Armament: 1 × twin 274.4 mm (11 in) guns; 4 × single 100 mm (3.9 in) or 121 mm (4.8 in) guns
- Armour: Belt: 250–330 mm (9.8–13.0 in); Deck: 50–120 mm (2.0–4.7 in); Breastwork: 300–333 mm (11.8–13.1 in); Turrets: 300 mm (11.8 in)

The Tonnerre class was a group of two coastal-defense ships built for the French Navy in the 1870s. A design based on the preceding Bélier-class ram but with similarities to the Royal Navy breastwork monitor Glatton, the class comprised Tonnerre and Fulminant. Their main battery of two 274.4 mm (11 in) was mounted in a single turret powered by a hydraulic machinery, an early use of the technology, that was situated forward of a narrow superstructure and was. The ships could be distinguished by their different engines, the diameter of their single funnel and the slightly different calibre of their secondary armament. They were commissioned into the Armoured Division (Division cuirassé) of the Northern Squadron (Esadre du Nord) in 1891. They participated in naval exercises. Changes in naval doctrine, alongside the introduction of more capable battleships and new technologies like submarines meant that the ships were obsolete. Tonnerre and Fulminant were struck in 1902 and 1905 respectively and, after serving as target ships, sold to the broken up.

== Design and development ==
On 10 November 1871, the Minister of the Navy (Ministère de la Marine) Louis Pierre Alexis Pothuau issued a specification for a new coastal defense ship. Of the three alternatives submitted on 9 August 1872, the French Navy accepted that developed by Louis de Bussy, which was signed on 29 July. The design was based on his existing second-class coastal defense ships, as epitomised by the Bélier-class ram, but with an armoured deck raised by 10 cm (3.9 in), sitting 90 cm (35 in) above the waterline and all vertical dimensions increased by 25 percent. Having a superficial similarity to the Royal Navy monitor Glatton but with a shorter breastwork, the design was agreed and built as class of two vessels.

=== Characteristics ===
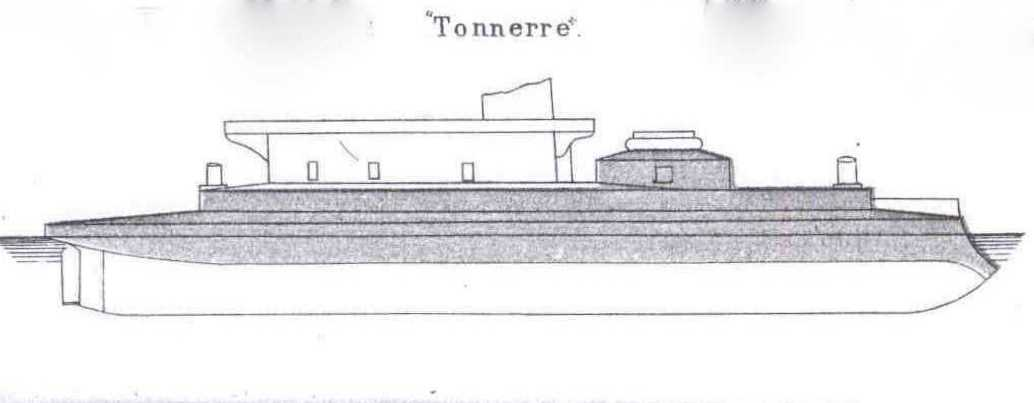
Plan view of the Tonnerre class

Breastwork monitors that had hull of steel, the ships of the Tonnerre class had a single turret forward and a narrow superstructure, 1.8 m (6 ft) wide, aft. The vessels displaced 5,588 metric tons (5,500 long tons), had an overall length of 78.6 m (257 ft 10 in), 75.6 m (248 ft) at the waterline and 73.6 m (241 ft 6 in) between perpendiculars. The ships' beam was 17.6 m (57 ft 9 in) at the waterline and draught was 6.421 m (21 ft 0.8 in) mean and 6.639 m (21 ft 9.4 in) aft. The ships' complement numbered 190 sailors of all ranks.

The powerplant for the two ships differed. Power for Tonnerre was provided by a single horizontal simple expansion steam engine while Fulminant was powered by a single horizontal Schneider compound engine. All drove one propeller shaft and vented through a single funnel, Tonnerre being distinguished by having a larger funnel. The engine on Tonnerre was rated at 3,400 indicated horsepower (2,500 kW) while that on Fulminant was rated at 3,500 indicated horsepower (2,600 kW). Steam was provided by eight boilers. The ships had a light mast and no sails. In service, the ships were rated at 14 knots (26 km/h; 16 mph).

The ships mounted a main battery of two 274.4 mm (11 in) 19.75-calibre Modèle 1875 guns in a single enclosed turret mounted forward. The guns were capable of firing every seven or eight minutes. They each weighed 27,850 kg (61,400 lb) and fired a shell that weighed 216 kg (476 lb). They were hydraulically loaded using the Rendell system, which also powered the turret. This was the first use of hydraulics in the French Navy to power a turret and, despite the equipment being supplied by the British firm W. G. Armstrong & Company, ahead of the Royal Navy adopting it to use in its turrets. Defence from torpedo boats was provided by either four 121 mm (4.8 in) 17-calibre 12-pounder bronze guns or four 100 mm (3.9 in) guns mounted at the corners of the flying deck, raised above the hull. The ships were fitted with a 3 m (9.8 ft) ram.

The ships were fitted with wrought iron armour with a full-length waterline armour belt that tapered from a maximum thickness of 330 mm (13.0 in) amidships to 250 mm (9.8 in) forward and 300 mm (11.8 in) aft. The deck armor was 50 mm (2.0 in) thick amidships with ends had 120 mm (4.7 in) of wood mounted on 10 mm (0.4 in) plating. The belt stretched from 1.51 m (59 in) below the waterline to 0.89 m (35 in) above. The breastwork had armour that was 333 mm (13.1 in) amidships and 300 mm at the ends. The turret was also protected by armour that is 300 mm thick, although the gun ports themselves were 350 mm (13.8 in) thick. The turret was itself 10.52 m (34 ft 6 in) in diameter. A cylindrical conning tower was mounted on the turret, supported on a fixed 1.42 m (4 ft 8 in) shaft.

=== Modifications ===
During their lives, the ships had their armament modified. Six 37-millimetre (1.5 in) Hotchkiss revolving cannon were added early in the vessels' service, which were replaced, in 1900, by six Canon de 47 mm (1.9 in) Modèle 1885 Hotchkiss guns and two 37-millimetre (1.5 in) Hotchkiss revolving cannons. Four 60 cm (24 in) Mangin searchlights were also added.

== Construction ==
Construction data
Name	Shipyard	Laid down	Launched	Commissioned
Tonnerre	Naval shipyard, Lorient	August 1873	16 September 1875	April 1878
Fulminant	Naval shipyard, Cherbourg	24 February 1874	20 August 1877	January 1881

== Service ==
Tonnerre and Fulminant were fully commissioned after undertaking trials on 1 April 1878 and 29 May 1885 respectively. Tonnerre was placed in reserve but was allocated to the Evolution Squadron (Escadre d'Evolutions) in 1884. Both vessels joined the Armoured Division (Division cuirassé) of the Northern Squadron (Escadre du Nord) in 1891. Although they saw little active service, the vessels participated in naval exercises. Fulminant joined the coastal defense ship Tempête, three cruisers and nine torpedo boats in a training exercise over 22 days from 22 June. Tonnerre operated with fellow ironclads Furieux and Victorieuse on another exercise between 26 July and 4 August 1893. Although nominally defending Cherbourg, the ship made a successful attack against a more powerful force on 3 August using dummy torpedoes. On 7 September 1894, it was announced that they were to be retired from active service and replaced by the newer Jemmapes-class ironclads.

French naval doctrine was changing and the focus on coastal defense was being replaced by one of larger sea-going warships. The size of ships was also increasing, and newer, more capable battleships entered service. Other technologies were also advancing that made the ships vulnerable to new forms of attack. In July 1902, Fulminant took part in a trial for the Aigrette-class submarines, where the ship acted as the target for them to demonstrate their stealthy characteristics. Neither vessel lasted far beyond that point. Tonnerre and Fulminant were struck on 12 December 1905 and 14 August 1908 respectively. Both were allocated to be target ships before being sold to be broken up, the latter on 4 November 1912 and the former between 1920 and 1922.
