= French ironclad Triomphante =

French Navy's La Galissonnière-class ironclad

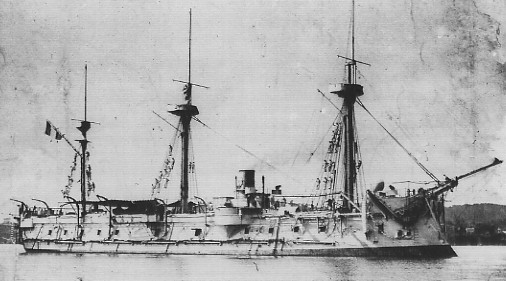
- Triomphante at anchor

History

France
- Name: Triomphante
- Builder: Rochefort
- Laid down: 5 August 1869
- Launched: 28 March 1877
- Commissioned: 17 October 1880
- Fate: Condemned 18 July 1896, sold 1903

General characteristics
- Class & type: La Galissonnière-class ironclad
- Displacement: 4,150 metric tons (4,080 long tons)
- Length: 76.85 m (252 ft 2 in)
- Beam: 14.88 m (48 ft 10 in)
- Draft: 6.3 m (21 ft) (mean)
- Installed power: 2,214 ihp (1,651 kW)
- Propulsion: 1 shaft, 2 vertical compound steam engines; 4 oval boilers
- Sail plan: Ship rig
- Speed: 12 knots (22 km/h; 14 mph)
- Range: 2,740 nautical miles (5,070 km; 3,150 mi) at 10 knots (19 km/h; 12 mph)
- Complement: 352–382
- Armament: 6 × 1 - 240 mm (9.4 in) Mle 1870 guns; 1 × 1 - 194 mm (7.6 in) gun; 6 × 1 - 138 mm (5.4 in) guns; 4 × 1 - 37 mm (1.5 in) Hotchkiss 5-barrel revolving guns; Harvey torpedoes
- Armor: Belt: 150 mm (5.9 in); Battery: 120 mm (4.7 in); Barbettes: 120 mm (5 in); Bulkheads: 120 mm (4.7 in)

Triomphante (Triumphant) was the third and last ship of the La Galissonnière class of wooden-hulled, armored corvettes built for the French Navy during the 1870s. Her construction was delayed for years and the navy took advantage of the extended construction time to upgrade her armament in comparison to the lead ship, La Galissonnière. She and her half-sister La Galissonnière participated in a number of battles during the Sino-French War of 1884–85. The ship remained in Asia and never returned to France after the war. She was condemned in 1896 and sold in 1903.

== Design and description ==
The La Galissonnière-class ironclads were designed as faster, more heavily armed versions of the Alma-class ironclads by Henri Dupuy de Lôme. They used the same central battery layout as their predecessors, although the battery was lengthened 4 meters (13 ft 1 in) to provide enough room to work the larger 240-millimeter (9.4 in) guns. Triomphante and her sister ship Victorieuse were modified by Constructor Sabattier who reduced the number of screws from two to one to improve their sailing qualities by reducing the drag from the stationary propellers, added an 194-millimeter (7.6 in) bow chaser under the forecastle and increased the caliber and number of the secondary armament.

Triomphante was 76.85 meters (252 ft 2 in) between perpendiculars and had a beam of 14.88 meters (48 ft 10 in). She had a mean draft of 6.3 meters (20 ft 8 in) and displaced 4,150 metric tons (4,080 long tons). Her crew numbered between 352 and 382 officers and men.

=== Propulsion ===
Triomphante had a single vertical compound steam engine driving a single propeller. Her engine was powered by four oval boilers. During sea trials her engine produced 2,214 indicated horsepower (1,651 kW) and the ship reached 12.75 knots (23.61 km/h; 14.67 mph). She only carried 330 metric tons (320 long tons) of coal which allowed her to steam for 2,740 nautical miles (5,070 km; 3,150 mi) at a speed of 10 knots (19 km/h; 12 mph). Victorieuse was also ship-rigged with three masts and had a sail area of 1,730 square meters (18,600 sq ft).

=== Armament ===
Triomphante mounted four of her six 240-millimeter Modèle 1870 breech-loading guns in the central battery on the battery deck. The other two 240-millimeter guns were mounted in barbettes on the upper deck, sponsoned out over the sides of the ship, just forward of the funnel. A 194-millimeter breech-loading chase gun was fitted under the forecastle. Triomphante's secondary armament of six 138-millimeter (5.4 in) breech-loading guns was also mounted on the upper deck.

The armor-piercing shell of the 19-caliber 240 mm gun weighed 317.5 pounds (144.0 kg) while the gun itself weighed 15.41 long tons (15.66 t). It had a muzzle velocity of 1,624 ft/s (495 m/s) and was credited with the ability to penetrate a nominal 14.4 inches (366 mm) of wrought iron armour at the muzzle. The 20-caliber 194 mm gun fired an armor-piercing 165.3-pound (75.0 kg) shell while the gun itself weighed 7.83 long tons (7.96 t). The gun fired its shell at a muzzle velocity of 1,739 ft/s (530 m/s) and was credited with the ability to penetrate a nominal 12.5 inches (320 mm) of wrought iron armour at the muzzle. The 138 mm gun was 21 calibers long and weighed 2.63 long tons (2.67 t). It fired a 61.7-pound (28.0 kg) explosive shell with velocity of 1,529 ft/s (466 m/s). The guns could fire both solid shot and explosive shells.

For defense against torpedo boats the ship also mounted four 37-millimeter (1.5 in) Hotchkiss 5-barrel revolving guns. They fired a shell weighing about 500 g (1.1 lb) at a muzzle velocity of about 610 m/s (2,000 ft/s) to a range of about 3,200 meters (3,500 yd). They had a rate of fire of about 30 rounds per minute. Triomphante also received several towed Harvey torpedoes.

=== Armor ===
The La Galissonnière-class ships had a complete 150-millimeter (5.9 in) wrought iron waterline belt, approximately 2.4 meters (7.9 ft) high laid over 650 millimeters (26 in) of wood. The sides of the battery itself were armored with 120 millimeters (4.7 in) of wrought iron backed by 520 millimeters (20 in) of wood and the ends of the battery were closed by bulkheads of the same thickness. The barbette armor was 120 millimeters (4.7 in) thick. The unarmored portions of their sides were protected by thin iron plates.

== Service ==
Triomphante was laid down at Rochefort on 5 August 1869 and launched on 28 March 1877. While the exact reason for such prolonged construction time is not known, the budget for the French Navy was cut after the Franco-Prussian War of 1870–71 and the French dockyards had not been reformed with working practices more suitable for the industrial age. The ship was commissioned as the flagship of the Pacific Squadron on 17 October 1880 under the command of Rear Admiral Brossard du Corbigny. On 15 February 1883 she became flagship of the Levant Squadron (French: Division Navale du Levant) under Rear Admiral Conte. On 28 May the admiral was ordered to shift his flag as Triomphante was ordered to Saigon.

Triomphante, and her half-sister La Galissonnière, were assigned to the Far East Squadron in 1884, under the command of Vice Admiral Amédée Courbet, and participated in several actions during the Sino-French War of 1884–85. Both ships fought in the Battle of Fuzhou, Triomphante sinking the wooden gunboat Zhenwei, and destroying coastal defenses defending the Min River. They supplied landing parties during the Battle of Tamsui in October 1884, but they were forced to retreat by Chinese troops, albeit at only a few casualties (5 killed and 10 wounded). Triomphante helped to capture the Pescadore Islands in March 1885 during the Pescadores Campaign, losing two killed and five wounded from her landing party. She became the flagship of the Far East Squadron on 1 April 1885 and remained as such until 5 February 1894 when she was reduced to reserve. Triomphante was condemned on 18 July 1896 and sold for scrap in 1903.
