= La Galissonnière-class ironclad =

French Navy's La Galissonnière-class of wooden-hulled, armored corvettes

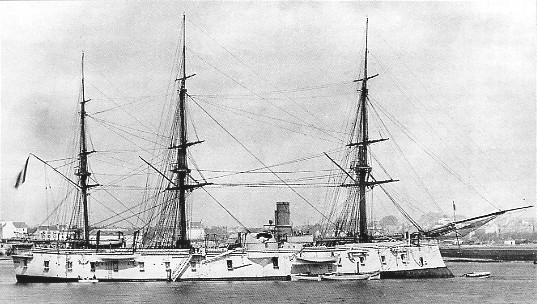
- La Galissonnière in 1885

Class overview
- Name: La Galissonnière class
- Builders: Arsenal de Brest; Arsenal de Toulon; Arsenal de Rochefort
- Operators: French Navy
- Preceded by: Alma class
- Succeeded by: Bayard class
- Subclasses: Victorieuse and Triomphante
- Built: 1868–1880
- In service: 1874–1900
- Completed: 3
- Scrapped: 3

General characteristics (La Galissonnière)
- Type: Ironclad
- Displacement: 4,654 metric tons (4,580 long tons)
- Length: 76.62 m (251 ft 5 in)
- Beam: 14.84 m (48 ft 8 in)
- Draft: 6.55 m (21.5 ft) (mean)
- Installed power: 2,370 ihp (1,770 kW); 4 oval boilers
- Propulsion: 2 shafts, 2 vertical compound steam engines
- Sail plan: Ship rig
- Speed: 12 knots (22 km/h; 14 mph)
- Range: 2,920 nautical miles (5,410 km; 3,360 mi) at 10 knots (19 km/h; 12 mph)
- Complement: 352–382
- Armament: 6 × 1 – 240 mm (9.4 in) Mle 1870 guns; 4 × 1 – 120 mm (4.7 in) guns
- Armor: Belt: 150 mm (5.9 in); Battery: 120 mm (4.7 in); Barbettes: 120 mm (5 in); Bulkheads: 120 mm (4.7 in)

The La Galissonnière-class ironclads were a group of wooden-hulled, armored corvettes built for the French Navy during the 1870s, meant as a heavier armed and faster version of the Alma-class ironclads. While all three ships were begun before the Franco-Prussian War of 1870–71, the construction of the last two ships was delayed for years. The navy took advantage of the extended construction time of the latter ships to upgrade their armament. La Galissonnière bombarded Sfax in 1881 as part of the French occupation of Tunisia. She and her half-sister Triomphante participated in a number of battles during the Sino-French War of 1884–85. Their sister Victorieuse had a much quieter career. All three ships were decommissioned in the 1890s.

== Design and description ==
The La Galissonnière-class ironclads were designed as faster, more heavily armed versions of the Alma-class ironclads by Henri Dupuy de Lôme. They used the same central battery layout as their predecessors, although the battery was lengthened 4 meters (13 ft 1 in) to provide enough room to work the larger 240-millimeter (9.4 in) guns. A two-propeller layout was adopted in an unsuccessful attempt to reduce the ship's draft. The two later ships were designed by Sabattier who reduced the number of screws from two to one to improve their sailing qualities, added an 194-millimeter (7.6 in) bow chaser under the forecastle and increased the caliber of the secondary armament.

La Galissonnière measured 76.62 meters (251 ft 5 in) between perpendiculars, with a beam of 14.84 meters (48 ft 8 in). She had a mean draft of 6.55 meters (21 ft 6 in) and displaced 4,654 metric tons (4,580 long tons). The ship had a metacentric height of .926 meters (3 ft 0.5 in). Victorieuse and Triomphante were 76.85 meters (252 ft 2 in) between perpendiculars and had a beam of 14.88 meters (48 ft 10 in). The two ships had a mean draft of 6.3 meters (20 ft 8 in) and displaced 4,150 metric tons (4,080 long tons). The crew of all three ships numbered between 352 and 382 officers and men.

=== Propulsion ===
La Galissonnière had two Wolf vertical compound steam engines, each driving a single 3.8-meter (12 ft 6 in) propeller. Her engines were powered by four oval boilers. On sea trials the engines produced a total of 2,370 indicated horsepower (1,770 kW) and the ship reached 13.08 knots (24.22 km/h; 15.05 mph). La Galissonnière carried 500 metric tons (490 long tons) of coal which allowed the ship to steam for 3,240 nautical miles (6,000 km; 3,730 mi) at a speed of 10 knots (19 km/h; 12 mph). She was ship-rigged with three masts and had a sail area around 1,707 square meters (18,370 sq ft).

Victorieuse and Triomphante had a single vertical compound steam engine driving a single propeller and the same boilers as La Galissonnière. During trials their engines produced 2,214 indicated horsepower (1,651 kW) and the ships reached 12.75 knots (23.61 km/h; 14.67 mph). They only carried 330 metric tons (320 long tons) of coal which allowed the ships to steam for 2,740 nautical miles (5,070 km; 3,150 mi) at a speed of 10 knots (19 km/h; 12 mph). They were also ship-rigged with three masts, but had a sail area of 1,730 square meters (18,600 sq ft).

=== Armament ===
All three ships mounted four of their six Canon de 24 C modèle 1870 (9.4 in) guns in the central battery on the battery deck. The other two 240-millimeter guns were mounted in barbettes on the upper deck, sponsoned out over the sides of the ship. In La Galissonnière the sponsons were positioned abaft the funnel, but the two later ships had theirs just forward of the funnel. La Galissonnière's secondary armament of four 120-millimeter (4.7 in) guns was also mounted on the upper deck. They were replaced by six 100-millimeter (3.9 in) guns in 1880.

The armor-piercing shell of the 19-caliber 240-millmeter gun weighed 317.5 pounds (144.0 kg) while the gun itself weighed 15.41 long tons (15.66 t). It had a muzzle velocity of 1,624 ft/s (495 m/s) and was credited with the ability to penetrate a nominal 14.4 inches (366 mm) of wrought iron armour at the muzzle. The guns could fire both solid shot and explosive shells.

The ship received four 37-millimeter (1.5 in) Hotchkiss 5-barrel revolving guns in 1878. They fired a shell weighing about 500 g (1.1 lb) at a muzzle velocity of about 610 m/s (2,000 ft/s) to a range of about 3,200 meters (3,500 yd). They had a rate of fire of about 30 rounds per minute. La Galissonnière also received several towed Harvey torpedoes.

While Victorieuse and Triomphant were on the stocks, their armament was reinforced by an additional 194-millimeter chase gun and the secondary armament was increased to six 138-millimeter (5.4 in) guns. They also received the Hotchkiss guns and Harvey torpedoes as per La Galissonnière before completion. The 20-caliber 194-millimeter gun fired an armor-piercing, 165.3-pound (75.0 kg) shell while the gun itself weighed 7.83 long tons (7.96 t). The gun fired its shell at a muzzle velocity of 1,739 ft/s (530 m/s) and was credited with the ability to penetrate a nominal 12.5 inches (320 mm) of wrought iron armour at the muzzle. The 138-millimeter gun was 21 calibers long and weighed 2.63 long tons (2.67 t). It fired a 61.7-pound (28.0 kg) explosive shell that had a muzzle velocity of 1,529 ft/s (466 m/s).

=== Armor ===
The La Galissonnière-class ships had a complete 150-millimeter (5.9 in) wrought iron waterline belt, approximately 2.4 meters (7.9 ft) high laid over 650 millimeters (26 in) of wood. The sides of the battery itself were armored with 120 millimeters (4.7 in) of wrought iron backed by 520 millimeters (20 in) of wood and the ends of the battery were closed by bulkheads of the same thickness. The barbette armor was 120 millimeters (4.7 in) thick. The unarmored portions of their sides were protected by thin iron plates.

== Ships ==
Construction data
Ship	Builder	Laid down	Launched	Commissioned	Fate
La Galissonnière	Brest	22 June 1868	7 May 1872	18 July 1874	Condemned, 24 December 1894
Victorieuse	Toulon	5 August 1869	18 November 1875	1876	Condemned, 8 March 1900
Triomphante	Rochefort	5 August 1869	28 March 1877	1880	Condemned, 18 July 1896, sold 1903

== Service ==
La Galissonnière's initial commissions were in the Pacific and in the Caribbean, but she was assigned to the Levant Squadron (French: Division Navale du Levant) when she bombarded the Tunisian port of Sfax in July 1881 as part of the French occupation of Tunisia. In early 1882 La Galissonnière was the flagship of the Levant Squadron under Rear Admiral Alfred Conrad. Both La Galissonnière and Triomphante were assigned to the Far East Squadron in 1884, under the command of Vice Admiral Amédée Courbet, and participated in several actions during the Sino-French War of 1884–85. Both ships fought in the Battle of Fuzhou, destroying a small Chinese fleet and coastal defenses defending the Min River. They supplied landing parties during the Battle of Tamsui in October 1884, but they were forced to retreat by Chinese troops, although suffering few casualties (11 killed and 4 wounded between the two ships). Nothing is known of any further participation by La Galissonnière in the war, but Triomphante helped to capture the Pescadore Islands in March 1885 during the Pescadores Campaign.

Victorieuse was placed into reserve after she finished her sea trials in 1876. She had two commissions as flagship of the Pacific and China Squadrons and was relieved as the flagship of the latter by La Galissonnière in April 1884. She became flagship of the Levant Squadron after she arrived in France, but was in bad shape and soon placed in reserve at Cherbourg. Victorieuse was on summer maneuvers off the Iberian coast in July 1893. The ship was initially condemned in May 1897, but this was reversed so she could convoy torpedo boats to Bizerte. That plan was later cancelled and Victorieuse was paid off in 1899, becoming guardship of the outer harbor at Brest until finally condemned the following year.
