= French ironclad Fulminant =

Coastal defense breastwork monitor of the French Navy

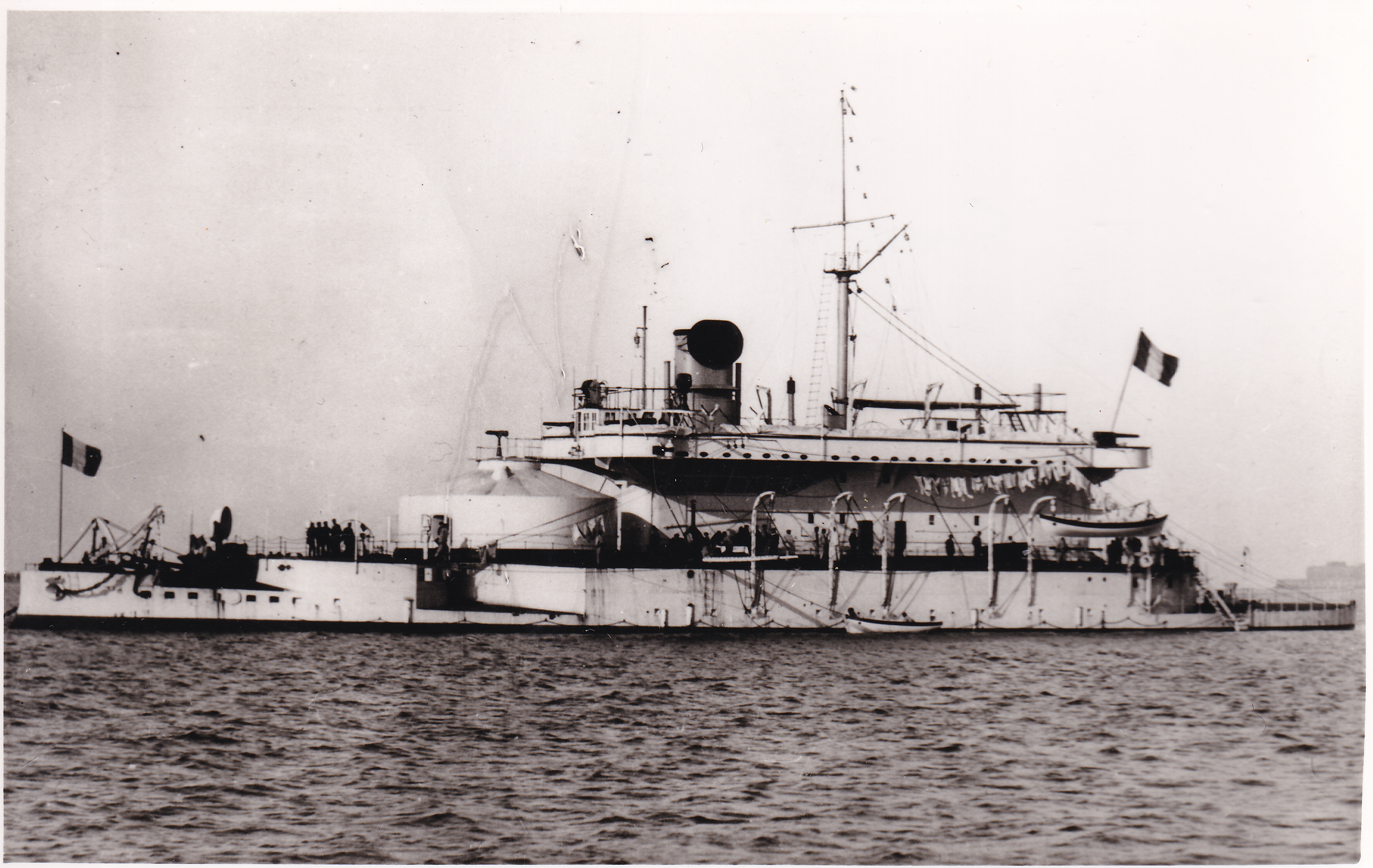
- Fulminant in 1894

History

France
- Name: Fulminant
- Builder: Naval shipyard, Cherbourg
- Laid down: 24 February 1874
- Launched: 20 August 1877
- Commissioned: January 1881
- Stricken: 14 March 1903
- Fate: Sold to be broken up on 21 December 1912

General characteristics
- Class & type: Tonnerre-class coastal defense ship
- Displacement: 5,588 t (5,500 long tons)
- Length: 78.6 m (257 ft 10 in) (o/a)
- Beam: 17.6 m (57 ft 9 in)
- Draft: 6.421 m (21 ft 0.8 in) (mean)
- Installed power: 8 × cylinder boilers; 3,500 ihp (2,600 kW)
- Propulsion: 1 shaft, 1 compound steam engine
- Speed: 14 kn (26 km/h; 16 mph)
- Range: 2,070 nmi (3,830 km; 2,380 mi) at 10 kn (19 km/h; 12 mph)
- Complement: 190
- Armament: 1 × twin 274.2 mm (11 in) guns; 4 × single 100 mm (4 in) guns
- Armor: Belt: 250–330 mm (9.8–13.0 in); Deck: 50–120 mm (2–5 in); Breastwork: 300–333 mm (11.8–13.1 in); Turrets: 300 mm (11.8 in)

Fulminant was the second of the two ships of the Tonnerre-class, coastal defense breastwork monitors built for the French Navy (Marine Nationale) in the 1870s. Launched in 1877, the ship was armed with a main armament of two 274.4 mm (10.8 in) Modèle 1875 guns mounted in a single turret that had armor 300 mm (12 in) thick. In 1887, the vessel was damaged near Brest while sailing between Cherbourg and Toulon, but was swiftly repaired. From 1891, the ship served in the Northern Squadron (Esadre du Nord}. As French naval doctrine moved from a fleet of smaller coastal defense ships to larger ocean-going battleships, the ship had a short active career. The warship was struck in 1908 and served as a target for the ships of the Mediterranean Squadron (Esadre du Meditérranée). Sunk and raised in 1911, Fulminant was sold a year later and broken up.

== Design and description ==
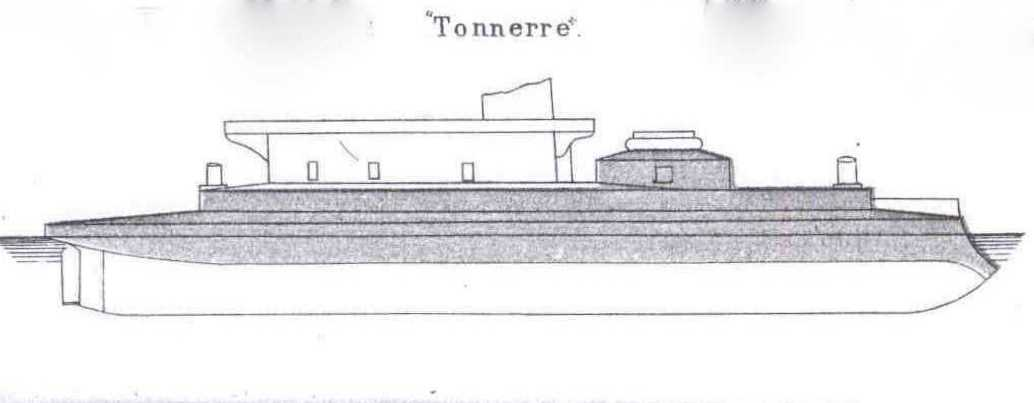
Plan view of the Tonnerre class

On 10 November 1871, the Minister of the Navy (Ministère de la Marine) Louis Pierre Alexis Pothuau issued a specification for a new coastal defense ship. Of the three alternatives submitted on 9 August 1872, the French Navy accepted that developed by Louis de Bussy, which was signed on 29 July. The design was based on his existing second-class coastal defense ships, as epitomised by the Bélier-class ram, but with an armored deck raised by 10 cm (3.9 in), sitting 90 cm (35 in) above the waterline and all vertical dimensions increased by 25 percent. With superficial similarity to the Royal Navy monitor Glatton but with a shorter breastwork, the design was agreed and built as class of two vessels. The second of the class was named Fulminant on 20 February 1874.

A breastwork monitor that had hull of steel, Fulminant had a single turret forward and a narrow superstructure 1.8 m (6 ft) wide aft. The vessel displaced 5,588 metric tons (5,500 long tons), had an overall length of 78.6 m (257 ft 10 in), 75.6 m (248 ft 0 in) at the waterline and 73.6 m (241 ft 6 in) between perpendiculars. The ship's beam was 17.6 m (57 ft 9 in) at the waterline and draught was 6.421 m (21 ft 0.8 in) mean and 6.639 m (21 ft 9.4 in) aft. The ship's complement numbered 190 sailors of all ranks.

Power for Fulminant was provided by a single horizontal Schneider compound steam engine with return connecting rods that drove a single propeller shaft. Steam was provided by eight high cylindrical boilers that were designed to run at a pressure of 4.133 kg/cm^{3} (149.3 lb/cu in) and vented through a single funnel. The engine had three cylinders, a high pressure cylinder of 1.77 m (5 ft 10 in) bore and 1.2 m (3 ft 11 in) stroke and two low pressure cylinders of 2.05 m (6 ft 9 in) bore. The engine was rated at 3,500 indicated horsepower (2,600 kW). While undertaking sea trials, Fulminant reached a speed of 13.882 knots (25.7 km/h; 16.0 mph) from 4,616 ihp (3,442 kW). The ship carried 281.6 tonnes (277.2 long tons; 310.4 short tons) of coal, which gave a range of 2,070 nautical miles (3,830 km; 2,380 mi) at a cruising speed of 10 knots (19 km/h; 12 mph). In service, the ship was rated at 14 knots (26 km/h; 16 mph).

Fulminant carried a main battery of two 274.4 mm (11 in) 19.75-caliber Modèle 1875 guns in a single enclosed turret. The guns were capable of firing every seven or eight minutes. They each weighed 27,850 kg (61,400 lb) and fired a shell that weighed 216 kg (476 lb). The guns were hydraulically loaded using the Rendell system, which also powered the turret. Defence from torpedo boats was provided by four 100 mm (3.9 in) guns mounted at the corners of the flying deck, raised above the hull. The ship was equipped with a 3 m (9.8 ft) ram. Six 37 mm (1.5 in) Hotchkiss revolving cannons were added, which were replaced, in 1900, by six Canon de 47 mm (1.9 in) Modèle 1885 Hotchkiss guns and two 37 mm (1.5 in) Hotchkiss revolving cannons. Four 60 cm (24 in) Mangin searchlights were also added.

The ship was fitted with wrought iron armor with a full-length waterline armor belt that tapered from the maximum thickness of 330 mm (13 in) amidships to 250 mm (10 in) forward and 300 mm (12 in) aft. The deck armor was 50 mm (2 in) thick amidships with ends had 120 mm (5 in) of wood mounted on 10 mm (0 in) plating. The belt stretched from 1.51 m (59 in) below the waterline to 0.89 m (35 in) above. The breastwork had armor that was 333 mm (13 in) amidships and 300 mm at the ends. The turret was also protected by armor that is 300 mm thick, although the gun ports themselves were 350 mm (14 in) thick. The turret was itself 10.52 m (34 ft 6 in) in diameter. A cylindrical conning tower was mounted on the turret, supported on a fixed 1.42 m (4 ft 8 in) shaft.

== Construction and career ==
Laid down on 24 February 1873 by the shipyard at Cherbourg, Fulminant was launched on 20 August 1877. Initially commissioned for trials on 12 August 1880, the ship was fully commissioned on 29 May 1885. The vessel was transferred for a short time to Toulon, but returned to Cherbourg the following year. On 26 February 1887, the ship was travelling back to Toulon when she struck a rock in the Chenal du Four off the coast near Brest. The ship was badly damaged and retired to Brest for repairs. In 1891, Fulminant was commissioned into the Armored Division (Division cuirassé) of the Northern Squadron (Esadre du Nord), serving for three years. On 22 June, the ironclad joined the coastal defense ship Tempête, three cruisers and nine torpedo boats in a training exercise over 22 days. Otherwise, the ship saw little service. On 3 March 1894, the boiler was extinguished as part of a refit and was subsequently reboilered.

French naval doctrine was changing and the focus on coastal defense was being replaced by one of larger sea-going warships. The size of ships was also increasing, and newer, more capable battleships entered service. Other innovations were also proving her vulnerability. In July 1902, Fulminant took part in a trial for the Aigrette-class submarines, where the ship acted as the target for them to demonstrate their stealthy characteristics. The submarines were able to approach within 400 mm (16 in) of the monitor before being spotted. The ship was struck on 14 August 1908 and reallocated, on 21 June 1909, to act as a target at Brest for the Mediterranean Squadron (Esadre du Meditérranée). While in that capacity, on 20 February 1911, the ship was sunk and raised seven days later. Fulminant was retired and replaced by the ironclad Hoche and transferred to the Domaines at Toulon to be put up for sale on 4 November 1912. A month later, on 21 December, Frank Rijsdijk bought the vessel, which was towed to Rotterdam during April 1913 and broken up.
