= French ironclad Tonnerre =

Coastal defense breastwork monitor of the French Navy

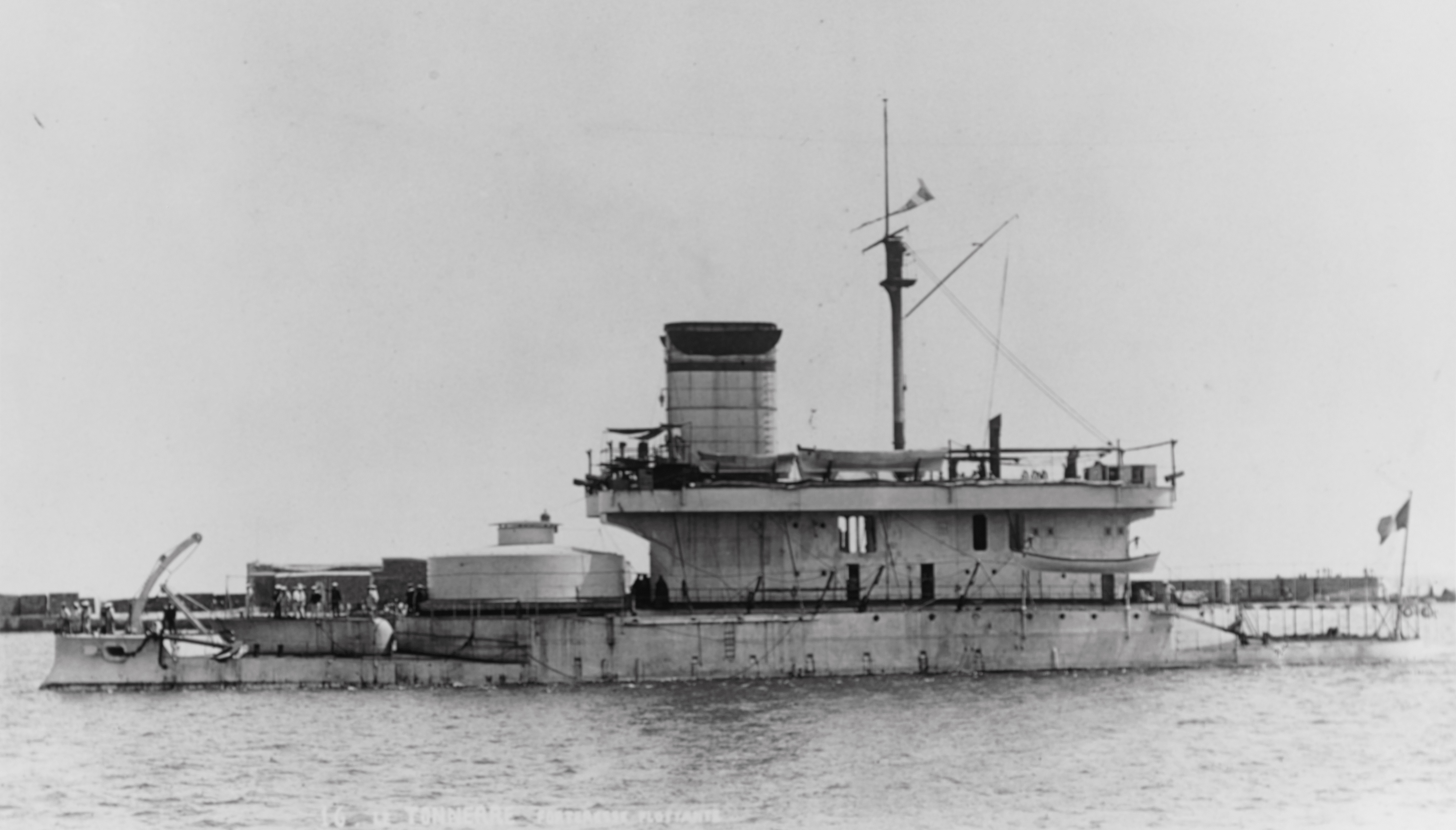
- Tonnerre

History

France
- Name: Tonnerre
- Builder: Naval shipyard, Lorient
- Laid down: August 1873
- Launched: 16 September 1875
- Commissioned: 1 April 1878
- Stricken: 12 December 1905
- Fate: Sold after 1920

General characteristics
- Class & type: Tonnerre-class coastal defense ship
- Displacement: 5,588 t (5,500 long tons)
- Length: 78.6 m (257 ft 10 in) (o/a)
- Beam: 17.6 m (57 ft 9 in)
- Draft: 6.421 m (21 ft 0.8 in) (mean)
- Installed power: 8 × rectangular boilers; 3,400 ihp (2,500 kW)
- Propulsion: 1 shaft, 1 single-expansion steam engine
- Speed: 14 kn (26 km/h; 16 mph)
- Range: 2,100 nmi (3,900 km; 2,400 mi) at 10 kn (19 km/h; 12 mph)
- Complement: 190
- Armament: 1 × twin 274.2 mm (11 in) guns; 4 × single 121 mm (5 in) guns
- Armor: Belt: 250–330 mm (9.8–13.0 in); Deck: 50–120 mm (2–5 in); Breastwork: 300–333 mm (11.8–13.1 in); Turrets: 300 mm (11.8 in)

Tonnerre was the lead ship of a class of two coastal defense breastwork monitors built for the French Navy (Marine Nationale) in the 1870s. Armed with a main armament of two 274.4 mm (11 in) Modèle 1875 guns mounted in a single turret that had armor 300 mm (12 in) thick, the ship was Launched in 1875, the vessel was originally commissioned into reserve at Brest. As French naval doctrine moved from a fleet of smaller coastal defense ships to larger ocean-going battleships, the ship Tonnerre had an uneventful career. Between 1884 and 1885, the ship served in the Evolution Squadron (Escadre d'Evolutions) but joined the Northern Squadron (Esadre du Nord) in 1891. As part of a naval exercise in 1893, the vessel participated in the successful defence of Cherbourg against a superior force. The ship was struck in 1905 and, after serving as a target, was sold after 1920.

== Design and description ==
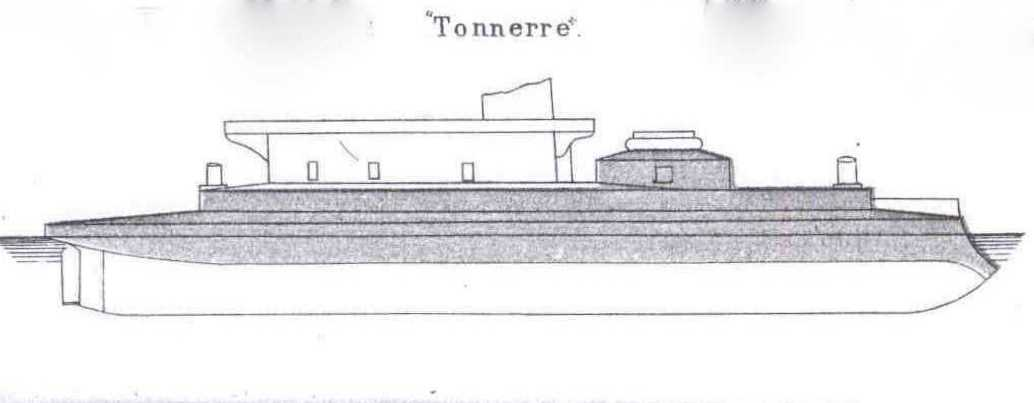
Plan view of the Tonnerre class

On 10 November 1871, the Minister of the Navy (Ministère de la Marine) Louis Pierre Alexis Pothuau issued a specification for a new coastal defense ship. Of the three alternatives submitted on 9 August 1872, the French Navy accepted that developed by Louis de Bussy, which was signed on 29 July. The design was based on his existing second-class coastal defense ships, as epitomised by the Bélier-class ram, but with an armored deck raised by 10 cm (3.9 in), sitting 90 cm (35 in) above the waterline and all vertical dimensions increased by 25 percent. With similarity to the Royal Navy monitor Glatton but with a shorter breastwork, the design was agreed and built as class of two vessels, the first named Tonnerre.

A breastwork monitor that had hull of steel, Tonnerre had a single turret forward and a narrow superstructure 1.8 m (6 ft) wide aft. The vessel displaced 5,588 metric tons (5,500 long tons), had an overall length of 78.6 m (257 ft 10 in), 75.6 m (248 ft 0 in) at the waterline and 73.6 m (241 ft 6 in) between perpendiculars. The ship's beam was 17.6 m (57 ft 9 in) at the waterline and draught was 6.421 m (21 ft 0.8 in) mean and 6.639 m (21 ft 9.4 in) aft. The ship's complement numbered 190 sailors of all ranks.

Tonnerre was powered by a reconditioned engine that had previously powered the ironclad Normandie. It was a single horizontal simple expansion steam engine that drove one propeller shaft. Steam was provided by eight reinforced high rectangular tubular boilers that were designed to run at a pressure of 2.25 kg/cm^{3} (81 lb/cu in). The engine had two cylinders, each of 12.085 m (39 ft 7.8 in) bore and 1.27 m (4 ft 2 in) stroke. The engine was rated at 3,400 indicated horsepower (2,500 kW) at 60rpm. While undertaking sea trials, Tonnerre reached a speed of 14.07 knots (26.1 km/h; 16.2 mph) from 4,166 ihp (3,107 kW). The ship carried 291 tonnes (286 long tons; 321 short tons) of coal, which gave a range of 2,100 nautical miles (3,900 km; 2,400 mi) at a cruising speed of 10 knots (19 km/h; 12 mph). In service, the ship was rated at 14 knots (26 km/h; 16 mph).

Tonnerre carried a main battery of two 274.4 mm (11 in) 19.75-caliber Modèle 1875 guns in a single enclosed turret. The guns were capable of firing every seven or eight minutes. The guns were hydraulically loaded, as were the turrets. The guns were designed to fire astern, but doing so damaged the superstructure. Defence from torpedo boats was provided by four 121-millimetre (4.8 in) 17-caliber 12-pounder bronze guns mounted at the corners of the flying deck, raised above the hull. The ship was equipped with a 3 m (9.8 ft) ram. Six 37 mm (1.5 in) Hotchkiss revolving cannons were added, which were replaced, in 1900, by six Canon de 47 mm (1.9 in) Modèle 1885 Hotchkiss guns and two 37 mm (1.5 in) Hotchkiss revolving cannons. Four 60 cm (24 in) Mangin searchlights were also added during the ship's time in service.

The ship was fitted with wrought iron armor with a full-length waterline armor belt that tapered from the maximum thickness of 330 mm (13 in) amidships to 250 mm (10 in) forward and 300 mm (12 in) aft. The deck armor was 50 mm (2 in) thick amidships with ends had 120 mm (5 in) of wood mounted on 10 mm (0 in) plating. The belt stretched from 1.51 m (59 in) below the waterline to 0.89 m (35 in) above. The breastwork had armor that was 333 mm (13 in) amidships and 300 mm at the ends. The turret was also protected by armor that is 300 mm thick, although the gun ports themselves were 350 mm (14 in) thick. The turret was 10.52 m (34 ft 6 in) in diameter. A cylindrical conning tower was mounted on the turret, supported by a fixed 1.42 m (4 ft 8 in) shaft that ran through the turret.

== Construction and career ==
Laid down in January 1873 by the naval shipyard at Lorient, Tonnerre was launched on 16 September 1875. Initially commissioned for trials on 15 September 1877, the ship was fully commissioned on 1 April the following year. The vessel was transferred to Brest, arriving on 22 June, and placed in reserve. Between 1884 and 1885 the ship served with the Evolution Squadron (Escadre d'Evolutions), before being returned to reserve at Cherbourg. In 1891, Tonnerre was commissioned into the Armored Division (Division cuirassé) of the Northern Squadron (Esadre du Nord) On 26 July, Tonnerre joined fellow ironclads Furieux and Victorieuse on a naval exercise. The flotilla was instructed to defend Cherbourg from a more powerful force of ironclads, cruisers and torpedo boats. They were successful in deterring the attacking force and, on 3 August, the ship participated in an attack against the enemy using dummy torpedoes.

On 7 September 1894, it was announced that the vessel was to be retired from active service and replaced by the newer ironclad Jemmapes. French naval doctrine was changing and the focus on coastal defense was being replaced by one of larger sea-going warships. The size of ships was also increasing, and newer, more capable battleships entered service. After being reboilered and rearmed in 1900, the ship served for five years before being struck on 12 December 1905. After serving as a target at Brest for one year and at Lorient for another twelve, Tonnerre was retired. The ship was put up for sale at Lorient between 1920 and 1922.
