= French ironclad La Galissonnière =

French Navy's La Galissonnière-class ironclad

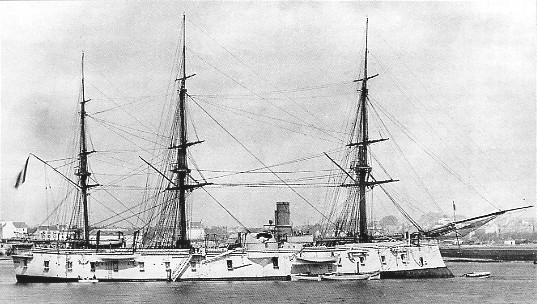
- La Galissonnière in 1885

History

France
- Name: La Galissonnière
- Namesake: Roland-Michel Barrin de La Galissonière
- Builder: Brest
- Laid down: 22 June 1868
- Launched: 7 May 1872
- Commissioned: 18 July 1874
- Fate: Condemned 24 December 1894

General characteristics
- Class & type: La Galissonnière-class ironclad
- Displacement: 4,654 metric tons (4,580 long tons)
- Length: 76.62 m (251 ft 5 in)
- Beam: 14.84 m (48 ft 8 in)
- Draft: 6.55 m (21.5 ft) (mean)
- Installed power: 2,370 ihp (1,770 kW); 4 oval boilers
- Propulsion: 2 shafts, 2 Vertical compound steam engines
- Sail plan: Ship rig
- Speed: 12 knots (22 km/h; 14 mph)
- Range: 2,920 nautical miles (5,410 km; 3,360 mi) at 10 knots (19 km/h; 12 mph)
- Complement: 352–382
- Armament: 6 × 1 - 240 mm (9.4 in) Mle 1870 guns; 4 × 1 - 120 mm (4.7 in) guns
- Armor: Belt: 150 mm (5.9 in); Battery: 120 mm (4.7 in); Barbettes: 120 mm (4.7 in); Bulkheads: 120 mm (4.7 in)

La Galissonnière was lead ship of a class of wooden-hulled, armored corvettes built for the French Navy during the 1870s. She was named after the victor of the Battle of Minorca in 1756, Marquis de la Galissonnière. She bombarded Sfax in 1881 as part of the French occupation of Tunisia and was present in Alexandria shortly before the British bombarded it before the beginning of the 1882 Anglo-Egyptian War. The ship participated in a number of battles during the Sino-French War of 1884–85. La Galissonnière was condemned in 1894.

== Design and description ==
The La Galissonnière-class ironclads (Note: Ironclad is the all-encompassing term for armored warships of this period. Armored corvettes were originally designed for the same role as traditional wooden corvettes, but this rapidly changed as the size and expense of these ships caused them to be used as second-class armored ships.) were designed as faster, more heavily armed versions of the Alma-class armored corvettes by Henri Dupuy de Lôme. They used the same central battery layout as their predecessors, although the battery was lengthened 4 meters (13 ft 1 in) to provide enough room to work the larger 240-millimeter (9.4 in) guns. A two-propeller layout was adopted in an unsuccessful attempt to reduce the ship's draft.

La Galissonnière measured 76.62 meters (251 ft 5 in) between perpendiculars, with a beam of 14.84 meters (48 ft 8 in). She had a mean draft of 6.55 meters (21 ft 6 in) and displaced 4,654 metric tons (4,580 long tons). The ship had a metacentric height of .926 meters (3 ft 0.5 in). Her crew numbered between 352 and 382 officers and men.

=== Propulsion ===
La Galissonnière had two Wolf vertical compound steam engines, each driving a single 3.8-meter (12 ft 6 in) propeller. Her engines were powered by four oval boilers. On sea trials the engines produced a total of 2,370 indicated horsepower (1,770 kW) and the ship reached 13.08 knots (24.22 km/h; 15.05 mph). La Galissonnière carried 500 metric tons (490 long tons) of coal which allowed the ship to steam for 3,240 nautical miles (6,000 km; 3,730 mi) at a speed of 10 knots (19 km/h; 12 mph). She was ship-rigged with three masts and had a sail area around 1,707 square meters (18,370 sq ft).

=== Armament ===
The ship mounted four of her six 240-millimeter Modèle 1870 guns in the central battery on the battery deck. The other two 240-millimeter guns were mounted in barbettes on the upper deck, sponsoned out over the sides of the ship, abaft the funnel. La Galissonnière's secondary armament of four 120-millimeter (4.7 in) guns was also mounted on the upper deck. They were replaced by six 100-millimeter (3.9 in) guns in 1880. The armor-piercing shell of the 19-caliber 240-millimeter gun weighed 317.5 pounds (144.0 kg) while the gun itself weighed 15.41 long tons (15.66 t). It had a muzzle velocity of 1,624 ft/s (495 m/s) and was credited with the ability to penetrate a nominal 14.4 inches (366 mm) of wrought iron armour at the muzzle. The guns could fire both solid shot and explosive shells.

The ship received four 37-millimeter (1.5 in) Hotchkiss 5-barrel revolving guns in 1878. They fired a shell weighing about 500 g (1.1 lb) at a muzzle velocity of about 610 m/s (2,000 ft/s) to a range of about 3,200 meters (3,500 yd). They had a rate of fire of about 30 rounds per minute. La Galissonnière also received several towed Harvey torpedoes.

=== Armor ===
La Galissonnière had a complete 150-millimeter (5.9 in) wrought iron waterline belt, approximately 2.4 meters (7.9 ft) high laid over 650 millimeters (26 in) of wood. The sides of the battery itself were armored with 120 millimeters (4.7 in) of wrought iron backed by 520 millimeters (20 in) of wood and the ends of the battery were closed by bulkheads of the same thickness. The barbette armor was 120 millimeters (4.7 in) thick. The unarmored portions of their sides were protected by thin iron plates.

== Service ==
La Galissonnière was laid down at Brest on 22 June 1868 and launched on 7 May 1872. While the exact reason for such prolonged construction time is not known, the budget for the French Navy was cut after the Franco-Prussian War of 1870–71 and the French dockyards had not been reformed with working practices more suitable for the industrial age. The ship began her sea trials on 20 April 1874 and was not commissioned until 18 July 1874. She became flagship of the Pacific Squadron on 16 May 1874 under the command of Rear Admiral Perigot. She returned to Brest on 19 March 1877, having circumnavigated the world via the Suez Canal. The ship was placed in reserve upon her return until she recommissioned on 15 August 1878 in preparation for a commission as flagship of the Caribbean Squadron which began on 6 October under Rear Admiral Peyron. Two years later she sailed to Cherbourg and was reduced to reserve on 13 May 1880.

La Galissonnière became the flagship of the Levant Squadron (French: Division Navale du Levant) under Rear Admiral Alfred Conrad on 27 May 1881. Shortly afterward she bombarded the Tunisian port of Sfax in July 1881 as part of the French occupation of Tunisia. In early 1882 La Galissonnière was present in Alexandria shortly before the British bombarded it before the beginning of the 1882 Anglo-Egyptian War. The ship remained in the Mediterranean through 1883.

La Galissonnière relieved her half-sister Victorieuse in April 1884 as the flagship of the Far East Squadron, under the command of Vice Admiral Amédée Courbet, just in time to participate in the Sino-French War of 1884–85. The ship fought in the late stages of the Battle of Fuzhou in August 1884 when she tried to pass a Chinese fort (known to the French as Fort Kimpaï) defending the entrance to the Min River. La Galissonnière failed to destroy the fort and was lightly damaged by a shell that struck her bow. It damaged her steam capstan and killed one man. The ship supplied landing parties during the Battle of Tamsui in October 1884, but they were forced to retreat by Chinese troops, although only nine men were killed. Nothing is known of any further participation by La Galissonnière in the war. She was ordered home in February 1886 and laid up for the last time in Cherbourg upon her return. The ship was condemned on 24 December 1894.

In June 1895, La Galissonnière was used as a target ship during experiments to determine the ability of modern ironclads to resist fire from coastal artillery batteries. For the tests, which were conducted off Cherbourg, she was fitted with additional armor plate, and two sheep were placed aboard to test the effect of shock waves from shell hits. Four 19 cm (7.5 in) shells were fired from a coastal artillery battery, all of which penetrated the armor. One of the sheep was killed by a shell blast, but the other survived, which demonstrated that the shock waves the French had believed would be fatal were not.
