= French ironclad Victorieuse =

French Navy's La Galissonnière-class ironclad

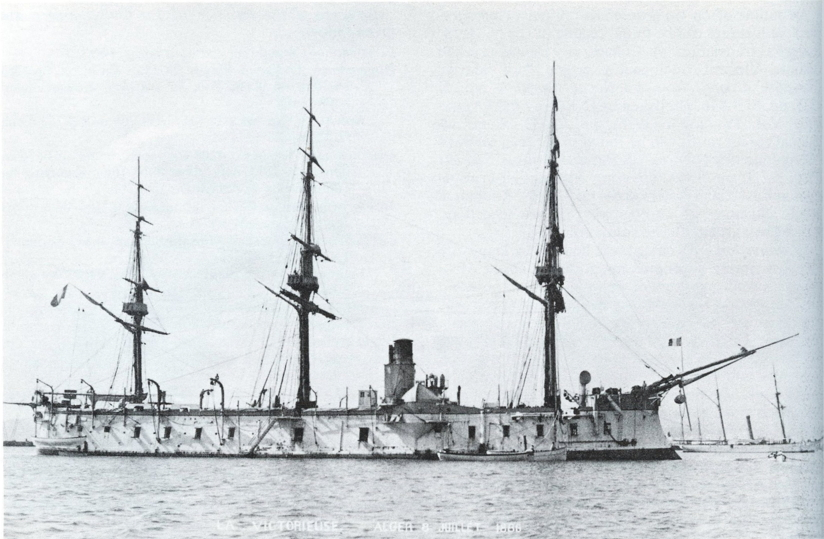
- Victorieuse in Algiers, 8 July 1886

History

France
- Name: Victorieuse
- Builder: Toulon
- Laid down: 5 August 1869
- Launched: 18 November 1875
- Commissioned: 17 August 1878
- Fate: Condemned 8 March 1900

General characteristics
- Class & type: La Galissonnière-class ironclad
- Displacement: 4,150 metric tons (4,080 long tons)
- Length: 76.85 m (252 ft 2 in)
- Beam: 14.88 m (48 ft 10 in)
- Draft: 6.3 m (21 ft) (mean)
- Installed power: 2,214 ihp (1,651 kW)
- Propulsion: 1 shaft, 2 vertical compound steam engines; 4 oval boilers
- Sail plan: Ship rig
- Speed: 12 knots (22 km/h; 14 mph)
- Range: 2,740 nautical miles (5,070 km; 3,150 mi) at 10 knots (19 km/h; 12 mph)
- Complement: 352–382
- Armament: 6 × 1 – 240 mm (9.4 in) Mle 1870 guns; 1 × 1 – 194 mm (7.6 in) gun; 6 × 1 – 138 mm (5.4 in) guns; 4 × 1 – 37 mm (1.5 in) Hotchkiss 5-barrel revolving guns; Harvey torpedoes
- Armor: Belt: 150 mm (5.9 in); Battery: 120 mm (4.7 in); Barbettes: 120 mm (5 in); Bulkheads: 120 mm (4.7 in)

Victorieuse (Victorious) was the second ship of the La Galissonnière class of wooden-hulled, armored corvettes built for the French Navy during the 1870s. Her construction was delayed for years and the navy took advantage of the extended construction time to upgrade her armament in comparison to the lead ship, La Galissonnière. Unlike her sisters, Victorieuse did not see any combat although she participated in the pacification of the Marquesas Islands in 1880. She was condemned in 1900.

== Design and description ==
The La Galissonnière-class ironclads were designed as faster, more heavily armed versions of the Alma-class ironclads by Henri Dupuy de Lôme. They used the same central battery layout as their predecessors, although the battery was lengthened 4 meters (13 ft 1 in) to provide enough room to work the larger 240-millimeter (9.4 in) guns. Victorieuse and her sister ship Triomphante were modified by Sabattier who reduced the number of screws from two to one to improve their sailing qualities, added an 194-millimeter (7.6 in) bow chaser under the forecastle and increased the caliber and number of the secondary armament.

Victorieuse was 76.85 meters (252 ft 2 in) between perpendiculars and had a beam of 14.88 meters (48 ft 10 in). She had a mean draft of 6.3 meters (20 ft 8 in) and displaced 4,150 metric tons (4,080 long tons). Her crew numbered between 352 and 382 officers and men.

=== Propulsion ===
Victorieuse had a single vertical compound steam engine driving a single propeller. Her engine was powered by four oval boilers. During sea trials her engine produced 2,214 indicated horsepower (1,651 kW) and the ship reached 12.75 knots (23.61 km/h; 14.67 mph). She only carried 330 metric tons (320 long tons) of coal which allowed her to steam for 2,740 nautical miles (5,070 km; 3,150 mi) at a speed of 10 knots (19 km/h; 12 mph). Victorieuse was also ship-rigged with three masts and had a sail area of 1,730 square meters (18,600 sq ft).

=== Armament ===
Victorieuse mounted four of her six 240-millmeter Modèle 1870 guns in the central battery on the battery deck. The other two 240-millimeter guns were mounted in barbettes on the upper deck, sponsoned out over the sides of the ship, just forward of the funnel. A 194-millimeter chase gun was fitted under the forecastle. Victorieuse's secondary armament of six 138-millimeter (5.4 in) guns was also mounted on the upper deck.

The armor-piercing shell of the 19-caliber 240-millmeter gun weighed 317.5 pounds (144.0 kg) while the gun itself weighed 15.41 long tons (15.66 t). It had a muzzle velocity of 1,624 ft/s (495 m/s) and was credited with the ability to penetrate a nominal 14.4 inches (366 mm) of wrought iron armour at the muzzle. The 20-caliber 194-millimeter gun fired an armor-piercing, 165.3-pound (75.0 kg) shell while the gun itself weighed 7.83 long tons (7.96 t). The gun fired its shell at a muzzle velocity of 1,739 ft/s (530 m/s) and was credited with the ability to penetrate a nominal 12.5 inches (320 mm) of wrought iron armour at the muzzle. The 138-millimeter gun was 21 calibers long and weighed 2.63 long tons (2.67 t). It fired a 61.7-pound (28.0 kg) explosive shell that had a muzzle velocity of 1,529 ft/s (466 m/s). The guns could fire both solid shot and explosive shells.

The ship also mounted four 37-millimeter (1.5 in) Hotchkiss 5-barrel revolving guns. They fired a shell weighing about 500 g (1.1 lb) at a muzzle velocity of about 610 m/s (2,000 ft/s) to a range of about 3,200 meters (3,500 yd). They had a rate of fire of about 30 rounds per minute. Victorieuse also received several towed Harvey torpedoes.

=== Armor ===
The La Galissonnière-class ships had a complete 150-millimeter (5.9 in) wrought iron waterline belt, approximately 2.4 meters (7.9 ft) high laid over 650 millimeters (26 in) of wood. The sides of the battery itself were armored with 120 millimeters (4.7 in) of wrought iron backed by 520 millimeters (20 in) of wood and the ends of the battery were closed by bulkheads of the same thickness. The barbette armor was 120 millimeters (4.7 in) thick. The unarmored portions of their sides were protected by thin iron plates.

== Service ==
Victorieuse was laid down at Toulon on 5 August 1869 and launched on 18 November 1875. While the exact reason for such prolonged construction time is not known, the budget for the French Navy was cut after the Franco-Prussian War of 1870–71 and the French dockyards had not been reformed with working practices more suitable for the industrial age. The ship was commissioned for her sea trials on 12 November 1876 and she was placed in reserve in Toulon after they were completed. She was recommissioned as the flagship of the Pacific Squadron on 17 August 1878 under the command of Rear Admiral Abel-Nicolas Bergasse du Petit-Thouars. The ship participated in the pacification of the Marquesas Islands in 1880, which had been conquered by the admiral's uncle (and adoptive father) Abel Aubert du Petit-Thouars forty years before. Victorieuse returned to Toulon on 23 May 1881.

The ship was recommissioned as the flagship of the China Squadron on 1 December 1881 under the command of Rear Admiral Meyer. She was relieved by her sister La Galissonnière in April 1884. She became flagship of the Levant Squadron after she arrived in France, but was in bad shape and soon placed in reserve at Cherbourg. Victorieuse became the flagship of Rear Admiral Barrera, second-in-command of the Northern Squadron on 10 February 1892. The ship was on summer maneuvers off the Iberian coast in July 1893. Two years later she became the flagship of Rear Admiral Ménard. She was initially condemned in May 1897, but this was reversed so she could convoy torpedo boats to Bizerte. That plan was later cancelled and Victorieuse was paid off in 1899, becoming guardship of the outer harbor at Brest until finally condemned the following year.
