= Tempête-class ironclad =

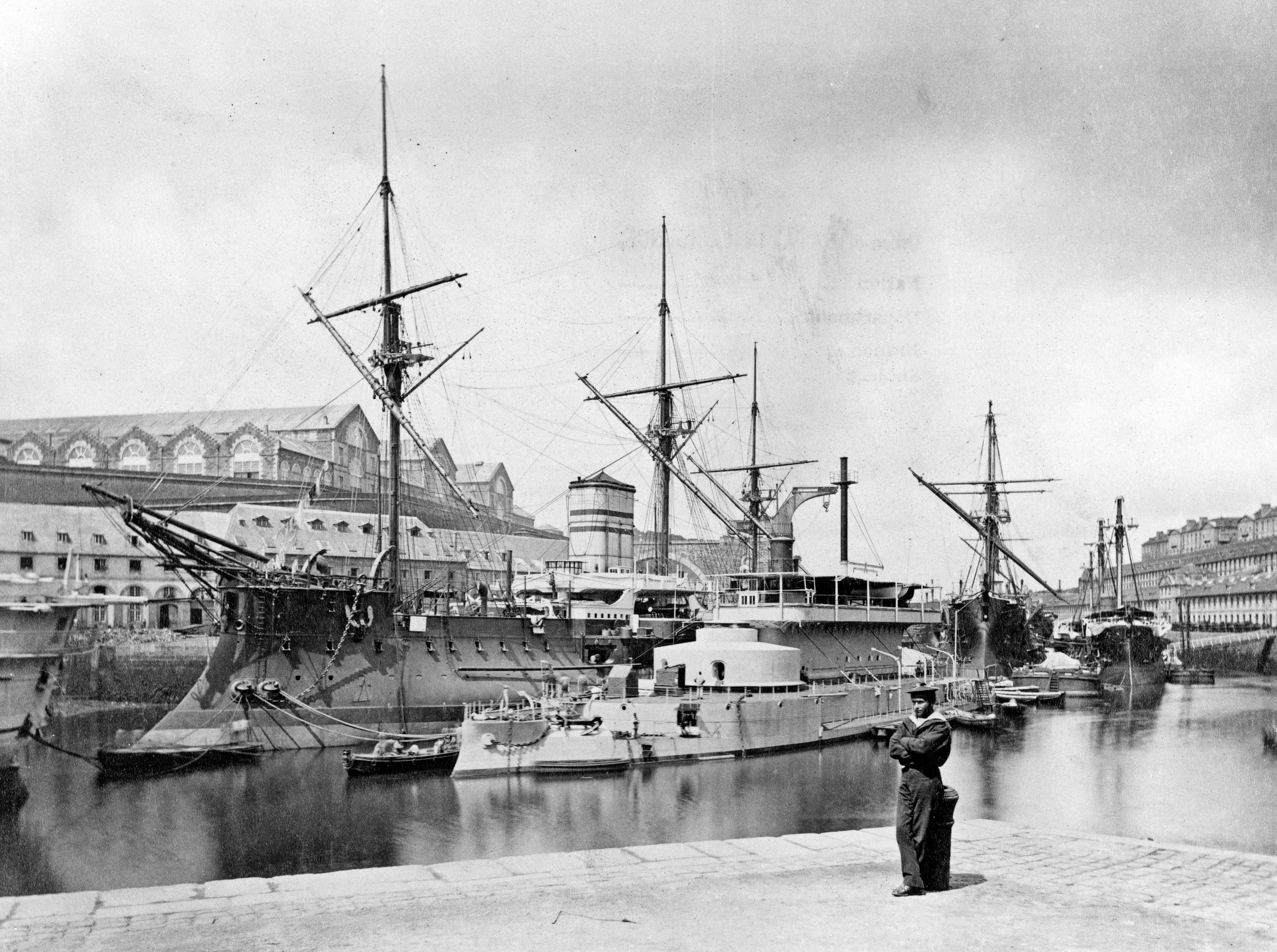
- Tempête fitting out c. 1878, behind her is the ironclad Redoutable

Class overview
- Name: Tempête
- Operators: French Navy
- Preceded by: Cerbère class
- Succeeded by: Tonnerre class
- Cost: FF14,986,587
- Built: 1872–1882
- In service: 1881–1906
- In commission: 1883–
- Completed: 2
- Scrapped: 2

General characteristics
- Type: Coastal-defense ship
- Displacement: 4,908 t (4,830 long tons) (deep load)
- Length: 73.6 m (241 ft 6 in) (o/a)
- Beam: 17.6 m (57 ft 9 in)
- Draft: 5.42 m (17.8 ft)
- Installed power: 4 cylindrical boilers; 2,000 ihp (1,500 kW)
- Propulsion: 1 shaft, 1 compound-expansion steam engine
- Speed: 10 knots (19 km/h; 12 mph)
- Range: 1,103 nautical miles (2,043 km; 1,269 mi) at 5 knots (9.3 km/h; 5.8 mph)
- Complement: 7 officers, 165 enlisted men
- Armament: 1 × twin 274 mm (10.8 in) guns; 4 × single 47 mm (1.9 in) guns; 4 × single 37 mm (1.5 in) guns
- Armor: Belt: 250–330 mm (9.8–13.0 in); Deck: 50 mm (2 in); Conning tower: 250 mm (9.8 in); Turrets: 300 mm (11.8 in)

The Tempête class consisted of a pair of ironclad coastal-defense ships built for the French Navy (Marine Navale) in the 1870s, Tempête and Vengeur.

== Design and description ==
The design of the Tempête-class coast-defense ships was based on that of the British breastwork monitors Glatton and Rupert. To maximize the traverse of the single gun turret, the superstructure was as narrow as possible, only 2.5 m (8 ft 2 in) wide. The ships had an overall length of 73.6 m (241 ft 6 in), a beam of 17.8 m (58 ft 5 in) and a draft of 5.33 m (17 ft 6 in) forward and 5.42 m (17 ft 9 in) aft at deep load. They displaced 4,908 metric tons (4,830 long tons) at deep load. The crew of the Tempête class numbered 7 officers and 165 enlisted men.

The Tempête class was powered by a single six-cylinder, horizontal compound-expansion steam engine that drove one propeller shaft using steam provided by four Indret cylindrical boilers. The engine was rated at 2,000 indicated horsepower (1,500 kW) and was intended to give the ships a top speed of 10 knots (19 km/h; 12 mph). During her sea trials Tempête reached a speed of 11.68 knots (21.6 km/h; 13.4 mph) from 2,164 ihp (1,614 kW). The ships carried enough coal to give them a range of 1,103 nautical miles (2,043 km; 1,269 mi) at a speed of 5 knots (9.3 km/h; 5.8 mph).

=== Armament and armor ===
The Tempêtes carried their main battery of two Canon de 274 mm (10.8 in) Modèle 1875 guns in a single twin-gun turret, forward of the superstructure. Defense from torpedo boats was provided by four Canon de 47 mm (1.9 in) Modèle 1885 Hotchkiss guns and four 37-millimetre (1.5 in) Hotchkiss revolving cannon. The 47 mm guns were positioned on the corners of the hurricane deck on top of the superstructure and the revolver guns were placed between them, two on each broadside.

The ships had a full-length wrought-iron waterline armor belt that tapered from the maximum thickness of 330 mm (13 in) amidships to 250 mm (9.8 in) at the ships' ends. The armored breastwork supporting the superstructure and the turret was 40 meters (131 ft 3 in) long and was also 330 mm thick. The main deck was protected by 50-millimeter (2 in) iron plates, as was the deck below it. The turret armor was 300 mm (11.8 in) thick and was backed by 550 mm (1 ft 10 in) of teak. The plates protecting the conning tower measured 250 mm in thickness.

== Ships ==
Name	Builder	Laid down	Launched	Commissioned	Fate
Tempête (Tempest)	Arsenal de Brest	26 December 1872	18 August 1876	4 July 1883	Sunk as a target, 20 March 1909
Vengeur (Avenger)	Arsenal de Brest	1 December 1874	16 May 1878	18 June 1882	Scrapped, 1906

== Bibliography ==
- Campbell, N. J. M. (1979). "France". In Chesneau, Roger & Kolesnik, Eugene M. (eds.). Conway's All the World's Fighting Ships 1860–1905. Greenwich, UK: Conway Maritime Press. pp. 282–333. ISBN 0-8317-0302-4.
- Caresse, Phillippe (2016). "The 'Flatiron': The Coast Defence Battleship Tempête". Warship 2007. London: Conway. pp. 161–174. ISBN 978-1-84486-326-6.
- Gille, Eric (1999). Cent ans de cuirassés français [A Century of French Battleships] (in French). Nantes: Marines. ISBN 2-909-675-50-5.
- Roche, Jean-Michel (2005). Dictionnaire des bâtiments de la flotte de guerre française de Colbert à nos jours [Dictionary of French Warships from Colbert to Today] (in French). Vol. Tome I: 1671–1870. Toulon: Group Retozel-Maury Millau. ISBN 978-2-9525917-0-6. OCLC 165892922.
- Silverstone, Paul H. (1984). Directory of the World's Capital Ships. New York: Hippocrene Books. ISBN 0-88254-979-0.
