= French ironclad Tempête =

Ironclad ship of the French Navy

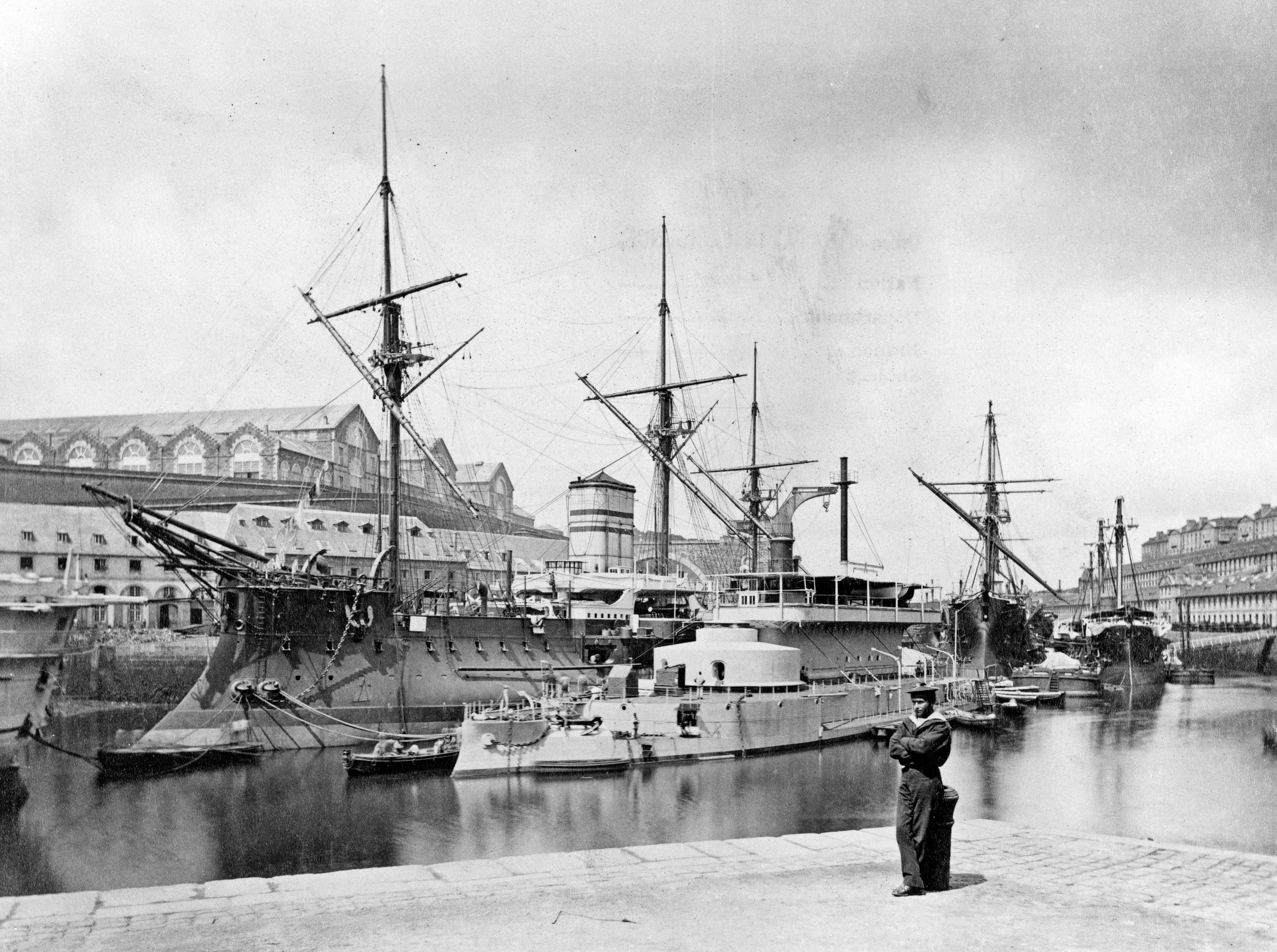
- Tempête fitting out c. 1878, behind her is the ironclad Redoutable

History

France
- Name: Tempête
- Namesake: Tempest
- Ordered: 26 December 1872
- Builder: Arsenal de Brest
- Cost: FF6,430,000
- Laid down: 26 December 1872
- Launched: 18 August 1876
- Commissioned: 4 July 1883
- Decommissioned: 15 February 1906
- Stricken: 26 April 1907
- Nickname(s): Le fer à repasser (flatiron)
- Fate: Sunk as a target ship, 20 March 1909

General characteristics
- Type: Coastal-defense ship
- Displacement: 4,908 t (4,830 long tons) (deep load)
- Length: 73.6 m (241 ft 6 in) (o/a)
- Beam: 17.6 m (57 ft 9 in)
- Draft: 5.42 m (17.8 ft)
- Installed power: 4 cylindrical boilers; 2,000 ihp (1,500 kW)
- Propulsion: 1 shaft, 1 compound-expansion steam engine
- Speed: 10 knots (19 km/h; 12 mph)
- Range: 1,103 nautical miles (2,043 km; 1,269 mi) at 5 knots (9.3 km/h; 5.8 mph)
- Complement: 7 officers, 165 enlisted men
- Armament: 1 × twin 274 mm (10.8 in) guns; 4 × single 47 mm (1.9 in) guns; 4 × single 37 mm (1.5 in) guns
- Armor: Belt: 250–330 mm (9.8–13.0 in); Deck: 50 mm (2 in); Conning tower: 250 mm (9.8 in); Turrets: 300 mm (11.8 in)

Tempête was the lead ship for her class of two ironclad coast-defense ships built for the French Navy (Marine Nationale) in the 1870s. Even though the ship was not fully commissioned until 1883, she played a minor role in the French occupation of Tunisia in 1881. Tempête accidentally sank a torpedo boat during night maneuvers in 1892 and was placed in reserve later that year. She became the flagship of the local defenses in French Tunisia in 1897 and was decommissioned in 1907. The ironclad served as a target ship for the next several years until she was sunk in 1909. Her wreck was salvaged beginning in 1912, but it was not completed until 1959.

== Design and description ==
The design of the Tempête-class coast-defense ships was based on that of the British breastwork monitors Glatton and Rupert. To maximize the traverse of the single gun turret, the superstructure was as narrow as possible, only 2.5 m (8 ft 2 in) wide. The ships had an overall length of 73.6 m (241 ft 6 in), a beam of 17.8 m (58 ft 5 in) and a draft of 5.33 m (17 ft 6 in) forward and 5.42 m (17 ft 9 in) aft at deep load. They displaced 4,908 metric tons (4,830 long tons) at deep load. The crew of the Tempête class numbered 7 officers and 165 enlisted men.

The Tempête class was powered by a single six-cylinder, horizontal compound-expansion steam engine that drove one propeller shaft using steam provided by four Indret cylindrical boilers. The engine was rated at 2,000 indicated horsepower (1,500 kW) and was intended to give the ships a top speed of 10 knots (19 km/h; 12 mph). During her sea trials Tempête reached a speed of 11.68 knots (21.6 km/h; 13.4 mph) from 2,164 ihp (1,614 kW). The ships carried enough coal to give them a range of 1,103 nautical miles (2,043 km; 1,269 mi) at a speed of 5 knots (9.3 km/h; 5.8 mph).

=== Armament and armor ===
The Tempêtes carried their main battery of two Canon de 274 mm (10.8 in) Modèle 1875 guns in a single twin-gun turret, forward of the superstructure. Defense from torpedo boats was provided by four Canon de 47 mm (1.9 in) Modèle 1885 Hotchkiss guns and four 37-millimetre (1.5 in) Hotchkiss revolving cannon. The 47 mm guns were positioned on the corners of the hurricane deck on top of the superstructure and the revolver guns were placed between them, two on each broadside.

The ships had a full-length wrought-iron waterline armor belt that tapered from the maximum thickness of 330 mm (13 in) amidships to 250 mm (9.8 in) at the ships' ends. The armored breastwork supporting the superstructure and the turret was 40 meters (131 ft 3 in) long and was also 330 mm thick. The main deck was protected by 50-millimeter (2 in) iron plates, as was the deck below it. The turret armor was 300 mm (11.8 in) thick and was backed by 550 mm (1 ft 10 in) of teak. The plates protecting the conning tower measured 250 mm in thickness.

== Construction and career ==
Tempête (Tempest), was authorized in the 1872 Naval Program as a second-class coastal-defense ship. She was ordered from the Arsenal de Brest on 26 December 1872 and was laid down that same day. The ship was launched on 18 August 1876, construction being delayed by numerous minor changes to the design. Tempête was commissioned for preliminary trials on 29 November 1879, but a boiler accident on 1 March 1880 burned three stokers. Her sea trials were completed on 26 March 1890, although the ship was not fully commissioned (armée definitif) until 4 July 1883. Despite this, she supported operations at Bizerte during the French occupation of Tunisia in 1881. Her construction cost 6,430,000 francs.

On 10 July, Tempête conducted tests to see if her wooden boats would be damaged by muzzle blast of her guns firing at their aft limit of traverse. The boats were undamaged, but the superstructure was damaged and needed to be strengthened. Later that year, she began taking on water in rough seas as she exited the Roadstead of Brest (Rade de Brest) and the Maritime Prefect (Préfet Maritime) of Brest decided that she was only to sail in fine weather. The ship ran aground in the roadstead on 4 August 1888 and had to wait until the next tide to free herself, although she proved to be undamaged when docked for examination. During night maneuvers in the roadstead on 20 July 1892, Tempête accidentally collided with and sank torpedo boat No. 76. The ironclad was reduced to reserve later that year.

Her boilers were replaced in 1896–1897 and she was declared operational again on 15 June of the latter year. Tempête became the flagship of the Naval Division of Tunisia (Division navale de Tunisie) that provided local defense for the eastern part of French North Africa and arrived in Bizerte on 25 July. She towed torpedo boat No. 122 to Algiers, French Algeria on 28 April–9 May 1898. The ironclad arrived in Toulon on 22 May 1900 for maintenance and she was damaged when her supporting timbers collapsed while she was in a dry dock to have her bottom painted. Much of her hull plating had to be replaced and the ship did not return to Tunisia until 8 August.

Thoroughly obsolete by this time, the ship was ordered back to Toulon on 30 December 1905 to pay off and arrived there on 22 January 1906; she was decommissioned on 15 February. Tempête was stricken from the navy list on 26 April 1907 and she was to be used as a target ship for the ships of the Mediterranean Squadron (Escadre de la Méditerranée). On 17–18 March 1909 Tempête was anchored in Alicastre Bay at the island of Porquerolles serving as target for the battleships Justice, Liberté, Saint Louis, and Gaulois. The ironclad required temporary repairs to remain afloat after being engaged by the latter ship on the 18th, but they were ineffective as Tempête began list to port. She capsized in bad weather two days later at coordinates 43°01′N 06°13′W.

An unsuccessful auction for the salvage right for the wreck was conducted on 4 February 1910, but it was sold on 21 December 1912 for 8,755 francs. Demolition was interrupted by the beginning of World War I in August 1914, but resumed on 18 September 1915 at a slow pace. After removing most of the hull and superstructure the wreck was abandoned in the mid-1920s. The remnants of the wreck, including her armament, was salvaged in 1959. Little remains there today.

== Bibliography ==
- Campbell, N. J. M. (1979). "France". In Chesneau, Roger & Kolesnik, Eugene M. (eds.). Conway's All the World's Fighting Ships 1860–1905. Greenwich, UK: Conway Maritime Press. pp. 282–333. ISBN 0-8317-0302-4.
- Caresse, Phillippe (2016). "The 'Flatiron': The Coast Defence Battleship Tempête". Warship 2007. London: Conway. pp. 161–174. ISBN 978-1-84486-326-6.
- Gille, Eric (1999). Cent ans de cuirassés français [A Century of French Battleships] (in French). Nantes: Marines. ISBN 2-909-675-50-5.
- Roche, Jean-Michel (2005). Dictionnaire des bâtiments de la flotte de guerre française de Colbert à nos jours [Dictionary of French Warships from Colbert to Today] (in French). Vol. Tome I: 1671–1870. Toulon: Group Retozel-Maury Millau. ISBN 978-2-9525917-0-6. OCLC 165892922.
- Silverstone, Paul H. (1984). Directory of the World's Capital Ships. New York: Hippocrene Books. ISBN 0-88254-979-0.
