= French ironclad Terrible =

Ironclad warship of the French Navy

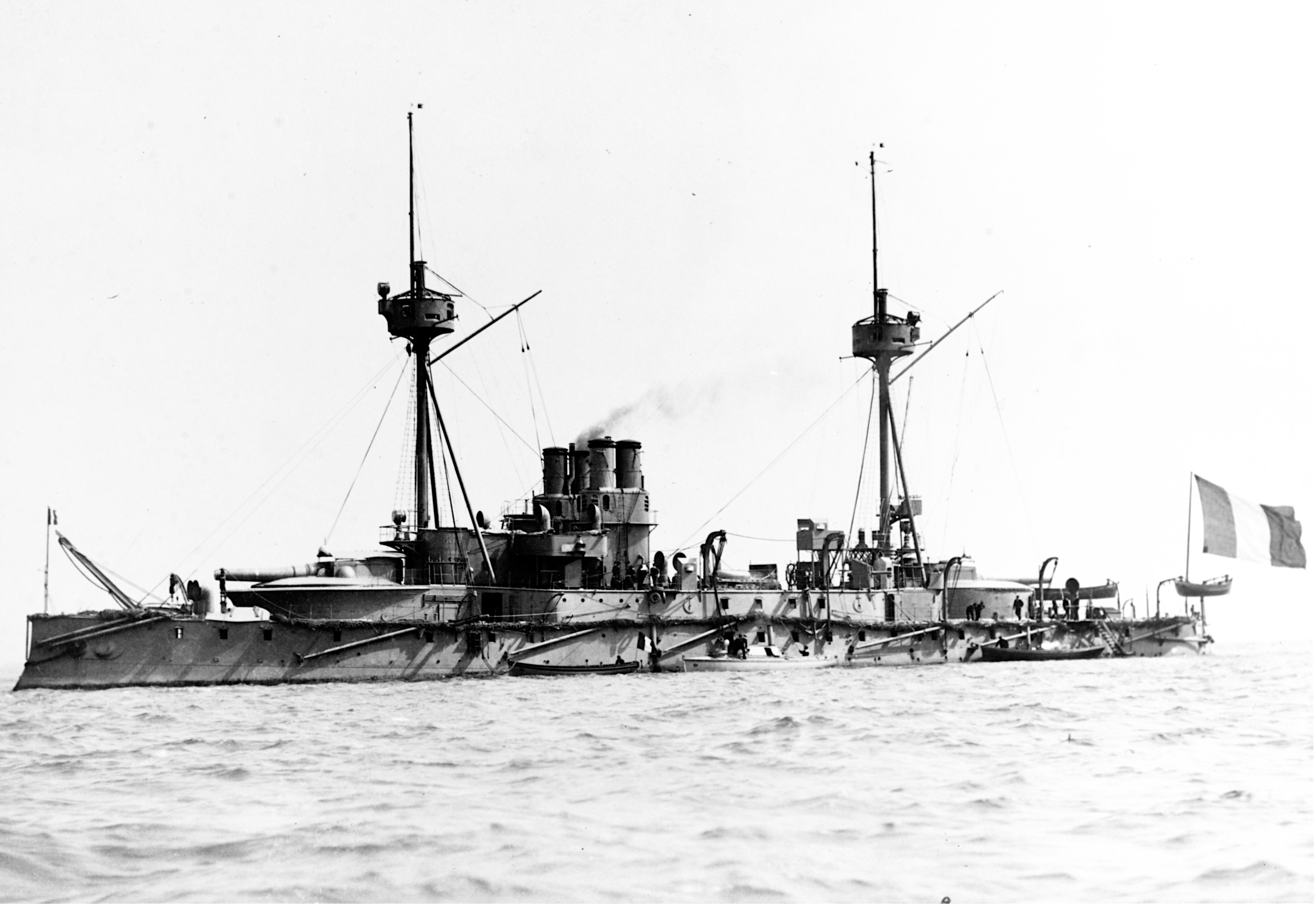
- Terrible's sister ship Requin in Britain in 1892

History

France
- Name: Terrible
- Laid down: 10 December 1877
- Launched: 29 March 1881
- Commissioned: 15 July 1886
- Stricken: 8 April 1908
- Fate: Sunk as a target ship, 28 August 1909

General characteristics
- Class & type: Terrible-class ironclad
- Displacement: 7,767.2 t (7,644.5 long tons; 8,561.9 short tons)
- Length: 88.25 m (289 ft 6 in) loa
- Beam: 17.78 m (58 ft 4 in)
- Draft: 7.74 m (25 ft 5 in)
- Installed power: 12 × fire-tube boilers; 6,000 ihp (4,500 kW)
- Propulsion: 2 × compound steam engines; 2 × screw propellers
- Speed: 14.5 to 15 kn (26.9 to 27.8 km/h; 16.7 to 17.3 mph)
- Range: 1,678 nmi (3,108 km; 1,931 mi) at 11 knots (20 km/h; 13 mph)
- Complement: 373
- Armament: 2 × 42 cm (16.5 in) guns; 4 × 100 mm (3.9 in) guns; 2 × 65 mm (2.6 in) guns; 2 × 47 mm (1.9 in) Hotchkiss guns; 1 × 47 mm Hotchkiss revolver cannon; 10 × 37 mm (1.5 in) Hotchkiss revolver cannon; 4 × 356 mm (14 in) torpedo tubes
- Armor: Belt: 300 to 500 mm (11.8 to 19.7 in); Deck: 80 mm (3.1 in); Barbettes: 450 mm (17.7 in); Conning tower: 25 mm (0.98 in)

General characteristics (as modernized)
- Installed power: 12 × fire-tube boilers; 4,238 ihp (3,160 kW)
- Speed: 13.5 knots (25.0 km/h; 15.5 mph)
- Complement: 332
- Armament: 2 × 340 mm (13.4 in) guns; 4 × 100 mm QF guns; 10 × 47 mm guns; 3 × 37 mm guns

Terrible was an ironclad barbette ship built for the French Navy in the late 1870s and early 1880s. She was the lead ship of the Terrible class, which included three other vessels. They were built as part of a fleet plan started in 1872, which by the late 1870s had been directed against a strengthening Italian fleet. The ships were intended for coastal operations, and as such had a shallow draft and a low freeboard, which greatly hampered their seakeeping and thus reduced their ability to be usefully employed after entering service. Armament consisted of a pair of 420 mm (16.5 in) guns in individual barbettes, the largest gun ever mounted on a French capital ship. Terrible was laid down in 1877 and was completed in 1887.

Due to their handling problems, Terrible and her sister ships saw little active service with the French fleet, instead spending most of their careers in the Reserve Squadron of the Mediterranean Fleet. During this period, the ship spent most of the year out of service with reduced crews, only being reactivated for the fleet maneuvers each year. She was modernized in 1898 with new guns, but by this time, numerous, more effective pre-dreadnought battleships had been built. These ships displaced Terrible and her sisters in the Reserve Squadron, and she was ultimately stricken from the naval register in 1909 and thereafter sunk as a target ship.

== Design ==
The Terrible class of barbette ships was designed in the late 1870s as part of a naval construction program that began under the post-Franco-Prussian War fleet plan of 1872. By 1877, the Italian fleet under Benedetto Brin had begun building powerful new ironclads of the Duilio and Italia classes, which demanded a French response, beginning with the ironclad Amiral Duperré of 1877. In addition, the oldest generation of French ironclads, built in the early-to-mid 1860s, were in poor condition and necessitated replacement. The Terrible class was intended to replace old monitors that had been built for coastal defense. Ships of the class were based on the Amiral Baudin-class ironclads, but reduced in size to allow them to operate in shallower waters. They nevertheless carried a larger main battery of two 42-centimeter (16.5 in) guns.

After entering service, the Terrible-class ships were found to have very poor seakeeping as a result of their shallow draft and insufficient freeboard, even in the relatively sheltered waters of the Mediterranean Sea. The Navy had little use for the ships, and through the 1880s and 1890s, a series of French naval ministers sought to find a role for the vessels, along with another ten coastal-defense type ironclads built during that period. The ships frequently alternated between the Mediterranean Squadron and the Northern Squadron, the latter stationed in the English Channel, but neither location suited their poor handling.

=== Characteristics ===
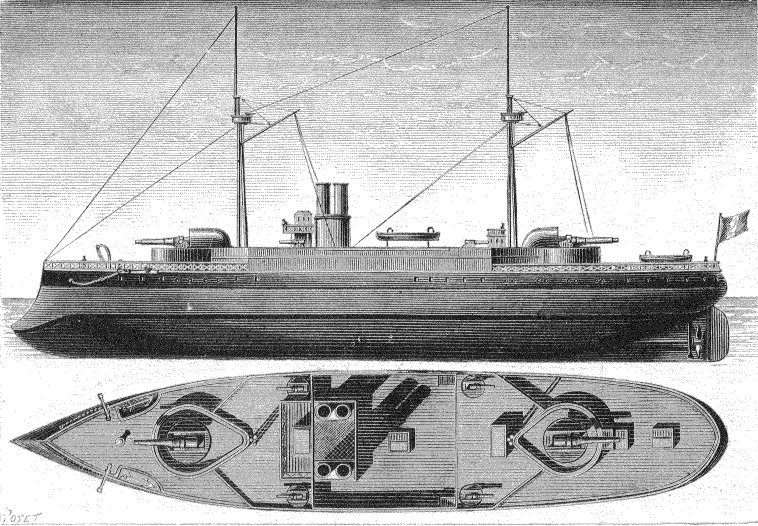
Sketch showing the side and top views of the class

Terrible was 88.25 m (289 ft 6 in) long overall, with a beam of 17.78 m (58 ft 4 in) and an average draft of 7.74 m (25 ft 5 in). The vessel displaced 7,767.2 metric tons (7,644.5 long tons; 8,561.9 short tons) and had a relatively low freeboard. Her superstructure was minimal and consisted of a small conning tower. She was fitted with a pair of tripod masts equipped with spotting tops for her main battery guns. The ship's crew consisted of 373 officers and enlisted men.

Her propulsion machinery consisted of two compound steam engines that drove a pair of screw propellers. Steam was provided by twelve coal-burning fire-tube boilers that were vented through a pair of funnels that were placed side by side, just aft of the conning tower. The engines were rated to produce 6,000 indicated horsepower (4,500 kW) for a top speed of 14.5 to 15 knots (26.9 to 27.8 km/h; 16.7 to 17.3 mph). The ship had a storage capacity of 394 t (388 long tons; 434 short tons) of coal, which allowed her to steam for 1,678 nautical miles (3,108 km; 1,931 mi) at a speed of about 11 knots (20 km/h; 13 mph).

Her main armament consisted of two Canon de 42 cm modèle 1875 19.35-caliber guns, one forward and one aft, mounted on the centerline in barbettes. These weapons were normally 22-caliber, but those mounted on Terrible had to be shortened after initial testing revealed cracks at the muzzle. They were the largest-bore guns ever carried by a French capital ship. These were supported by a secondary battery of four 100 mm (3.9 in) 26.2-cal. M1881 guns carried in individual pivot mounts with gun shields. For defense against torpedo boats, she carried two 65 mm (2.6 in) guns, two 47 mm (1.9 in) M1885 quick-firing guns, one 47 mm Hotchkiss revolver cannon, and ten 37 mm (1.5 in) revolver cannon, all in individual mounts. Her armament was rounded out with four 356 mm (14 in) torpedo tubes in the hull above the waterline, two tubes per side.

The ship was protected with mild steel armor; her belt was 500 mm (19.7 in) thick amidships, where it protected the ship's propulsion machinery spaces and ammunition magazines. On either end of the central portion, the belt was reduced to 300 mm (11.8 in), and it extended for the entire length of the hull. At even normal loading, the belt was nearly submerged entirely, reducing its effectiveness significantly. Her armor deck was 80 mm (3.1 in) layered on 16 mm (0.63 in) of hull plating, and it curved downward at the sides. The barbettes for the main battery were 450 mm (18 in) thick, layered on top of 30 mm (1.2 in) hull plating, and the tubular supports connecting them to the ammunition magazines were 200 mm (7.9 in). They were fitted with 17 mm (0.7 in) hoods to protect the gun crews from shell fragments. Her conning tower armor was 25 mm (0.98 in) thick, as were the shields for the 100 mm guns.

=== Modifications ===
Terrible was modernized several times during her career, primarily in attempts to correct deficiencies in her design that stemmed from excessive weights. She was found to be some 600 t (590 long tons; 660 short tons) overweight, which hampered her seakeeping and reduced stability. The first refit took place at Toulon between November 1898 and January 1899, and involved replacing her original boilers with twelve new models. Her heavy tripod masts were replaced with simple pole masts, and a new conning tower with 60 mm (2.4 in) sides was installed. In trials carried out in February 1899, Terrible reached 4,238 ihp (3,160 kW) for a top speed of 13.5 knots (25.0 km/h; 15.5 mph).

In November 1899, Terrible returned to the shipyard at Toulon to be rearmed. Her old 420 mm guns were replaced with two 35-caliber 340 mm (13.4 in) Modèle 1893 guns, and 504 mm (19.8 in) gun shields were fitted to the fronts of the barbettes. Her secondary battery of 100 mm guns was replaced with a quick-firing version of the weapon. The light battery was also revised to fourteen 47 mm guns and three 37 mm autocannon. All of her torpedo tubes were also removed. Work on the ship was completed in May 1900. As a result of these changes, her crew was reduced to 332 officers and men.

== Service history ==
Sketch of her sister Caïman

Terrible was laid down on 10 December 1877 in Brest, France, and was launched on 29 March 1881. Her launch date had been accelerated so the slipway she occupied could be used to lay down the new ironclad Neptune. Installation of the ship's machinery began on 17 September 1882 and lasted until 16 February 1884. Terrible was commissioned on 15 July 1886 to begin sea trials, which included her official acceptance trials from February to May 1887. Following the conclusion of this testing, she was pronounced complete in June, though on 22 June she was allocated to the 2nd category of reserve. She remained out of service for the next year and a half before being recommissioned on 23 January 1888. She sailed for Toulon on France's Mediterranean coast, where she was returned to the reserve on 13 April. Terrible was activated on 23 August for the annual fleet maneuvers, though she was delayed somewhat by a shortage of propellant charges for her guns. The fleet had assembled at Hyères by 30 August and the maneuvers ended on 4 September, with the fleet returning to Toulon by the 10th.

By the early 1890s, Terrible and her sister ships had been reduced to the Reserve Squadron of the Mediterranean Fleet, which was based in Toulon. During this period, the ships were maintained in a state of inactivity with half or two-thirds of their normal crews, only being mobilized for the annual training maneuvers with the rest of the fleet. During the fleet maneuvers of 1891, which began on 23 June, Terrible was mobilized along with her sisters Caïman and Indomptable and five other ironclads. The reserve ships took several days to ready themselves for the exercises before they were able to join the rest of the fleet by 6 July, the maneuvers lasting another five days thereafter. Terrible served with the Reserve Squadron of the Mediterranean Fleet in 1893; at that time, the squadron also included Caïman and Indomptable and the ironclads Colbert, Friedland, Richelieu, Redoutable, and Trident.

In 1894, Terrible had been assigned to the 1st Division, Reserve Squadron, along with Caïman and Richelieu. She served in the fleet maneuvers in the Mediterranean that year, which included an initial period of exercises from 1 to 10 July and then larger-scale maneuvers from 17 to 28 July. She remained in the squadron the following year, by which time Indomptable and the ironclad Amiral Duperré had joined her. In 1896, the Reserve Squadron consisted of Amiral Duperré, the flagship, Caïman, Terrible, and Trident. By the following year, the unit was again revised, now consisting of Caïman, Terrible, Amiral Duperré, and the ironclads Friedland and Dévastation. Terrible was reduced to the 2nd category of reserve on 10 September 1897 to be modernized.

Line-drawing of the other three members of the Terrible class after refit; Terrible differed in that she retained her original barbettes, rather than the enclosed, balanced turrets her sisters received

The ship's extensive modernization was carried out in two stages between 1898 and 1900; the first step was completed on 15 January 1899 and Terrible was assigned to the Coastal Defense Division five days later and was recommissioned on 23 January. At that time, the unit consisted of Caïman and the ironclads Amiral-Tréhouart, Bouvines, Jemmapes, and Valmy. She remained on active service until she was decommissioned for the second half of her reconstruction on 10 November. The work was completed in mid-1900, and she carried out gunnery trials on 10 July. For the 1900 training year, the reserve squadron was again reorganized, now consisting of a division of the sea-going ironclads Marceau, Neptune, and Courbet and a division of coastal ironclads led by Terrible and including Furieux, Tonnant, and Vengeur. The squadron was not activated for the annual fleet maneuvers that year. On 1 August, Terrible was placed in the 2nd category of reserve.

Terrible was the only member of her class available for the Reserve Squadron by 1901, as her sisters were still out of service, undergoing their reconstructions. Since a number of older vessels were being rebuilt at that time, the only other capital ship in the squadron was the ironclad Magenta. The next year, she was laid up out of service. By 1903, all four of the Terrible-class ironclads had been removed from service, their place in the Reserve Squadron having been taken by the pre-dreadnought battleships that had been built in the 1890s. Terrible was only activated for limited machinery tests from 4 to 5 June 1903, and again from 1 to 2 December 1904. She was reduced to special reserve in 1906, and she was struck from the naval register on 8 April 1908. The navy initially planned to sell the vessel, but she was instead converted into a target ship. Conversion work was completed by 6 July 1909, and during firing practice on 28 August, the battleships of the fleet fired some 300 rounds at Terrible, inflicting fatal damage. She capsized and sank two days later. Her two 340 mm guns were retained in storage and were later converted into railway guns during World War I in 1916 and delivered to the French Army in November 1917.
