= French ironclad Requin =

Ironclad warship of the French Navy

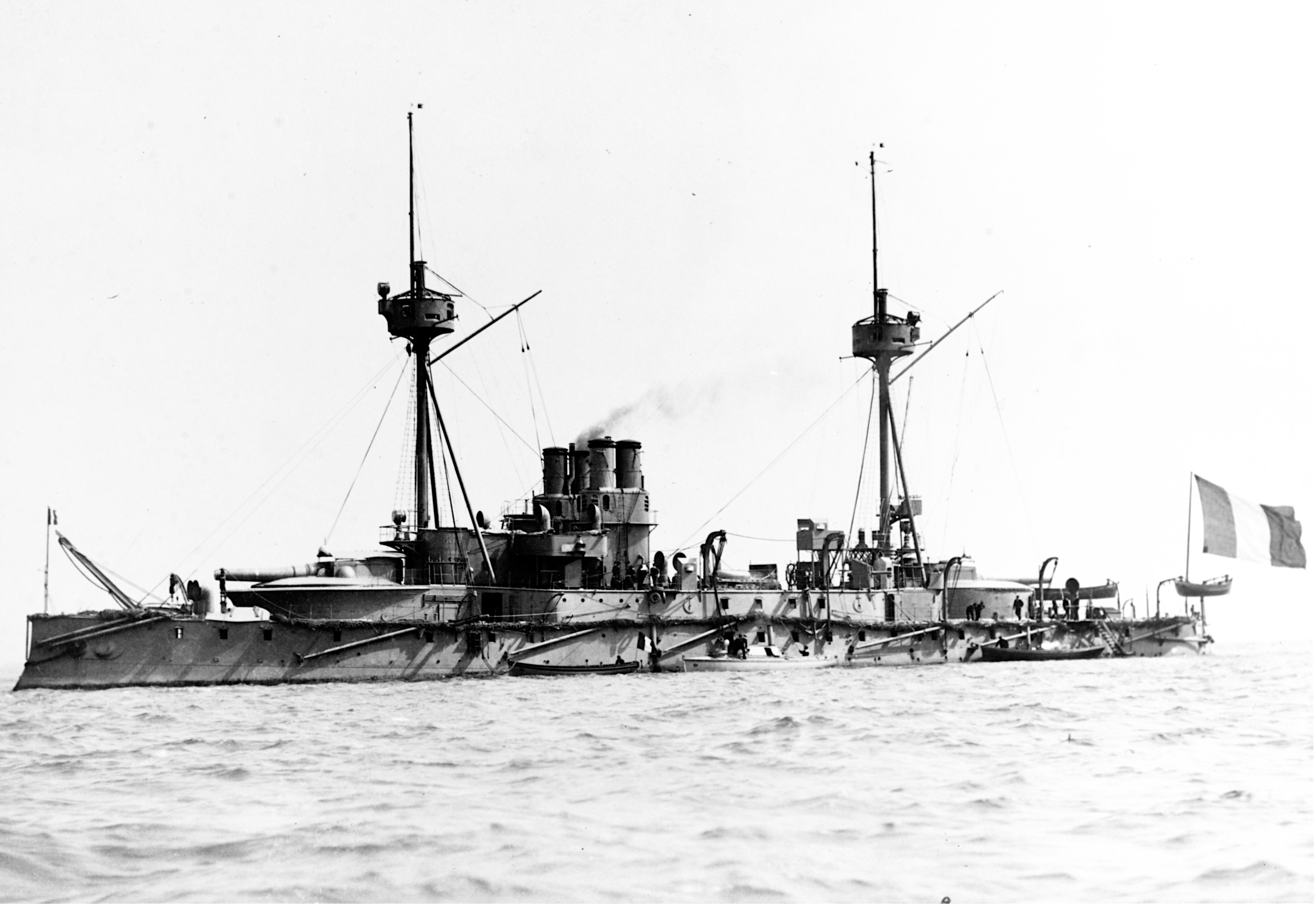
- Requin in Britain in 1892

History

France
- Name: Requin
- Laid down: 15 November 1878
- Launched: 13 June 1885
- Commissioned: 1 December 1888
- Decommissioned: 1 August 1919
- Stricken: 21 June 1920
- Fate: Broken up, 1921

General characteristics
- Class & type: Terrible-class ironclad
- Displacement: 7,767.2 t (7,644.5 long tons; 8,561.9 short tons)
- Length: 88.25 m (289 ft 6 in) loa
- Beam: 17.78 m (58 ft 4 in)
- Draft: 7.74 m (25 ft 5 in)
- Installed power: 10 × fire-tube boilers; 6,000 ihp (4,500 kW)
- Propulsion: 2 × compound steam engines; 2 × screw propellers
- Speed: 14.5 to 15 kn (26.9 to 27.8 km/h; 16.7 to 17.3 mph)
- Range: 1,678 nmi (3,108 km; 1,931 mi) at 11 knots (20 km/h; 13 mph)
- Complement: 373
- Armament: 2 × 42 cm (16.5 in) guns; 4 × 100 mm (3.9 in) guns; 2 × 65 mm (2.6 in) guns; 2 × 47 mm (1.9 in) Hotchkiss guns; 1 × 47 mm Hotchkiss revolver cannon; 10 × 37 mm (1.5 in) Hotchkiss revolver cannon; 4 × 356 mm (14 in) torpedo tubes
- Armor: Belt: 300 to 500 mm (11.8 to 19.7 in); Deck: 80 mm (3.1 in); Barbettes: 450 mm (17.7 in); Conning tower: 25 mm (0.98 in)

General characteristics (as modernized)
- Installed power: 12 × Niclausse boilers; 6,130 ihp (4,570 kW)
- Complement: 332
- Armament: 2 × 274 mm (10.8 in) guns; 6 × 100 mm QF guns; 10 × 47 mm guns; 3 × 37 mm guns

Requin was an ironclad barbette ship built for the French Navy in the late 1870s and early 1880s. She was last member of the four-ship Terrible class. They were built as part of a fleet plan started in 1872, which by the late 1870s had been directed against a strengthening Italian fleet. The ships were intended for coastal operations, and as such had a shallow draft and a low freeboard, which greatly hampered their seakeeping and thus reduced their ability to be usefully employed outside of coastal operations after entering service. Armament consisted of a pair of 420 mm (16.5 in) guns in individual barbettes, the largest-caliber gun ever mounted on a French capital ship. Requin was laid down in 1878 and was completed in 1887.

Unlike her sister ships that served in the Mediterranean Fleet, Requin spent her early career in the Northern Squadron in the English Channel. In 1891, the unit was sent to visit Britain and Russia. She was withdrawn from service in 1896 to be modernized with new armament, propulsion system, and armor. Work was completed in 1901 and the next year she returned to service as a guard ship based in Cherbourg. She was the only member of the class to see action during World War I, during which she was stationed in the Suez Canal to defend the waterway against attacks from the Ottoman Empire. She helped to repel a major attack in February 1915, and supported Allied operations along the coast of Ottoman Palestine in 1917. She was briefly used as a training ship after the war, before being broken up in 1921.

== Design ==
The Terrible class of barbette ships was designed in the late 1870s as part of a naval construction program that began under the post-Franco-Prussian War fleet plan of 1872. By 1877, the Italian fleet under Benedetto Brin had begun building powerful new ironclads of the Duilio and Italia classes, which demanded a French response, beginning with the ironclad Amiral Duperré of 1877. In addition, the oldest generation of French ironclads, built in the early-to-mid 1860s, were in poor condition and necessitated replacement. The Terrible class was intended to replace old monitors that had been built for coastal defense. Ships of the class were based on the Amiral Baudin-class ironclads, but reduced in size to allow them to operate in shallower waters. They nevertheless carried a larger main battery of two 42-centimeter (16.5 in) guns.

After entering service, the Terrible-class ships were found to have very poor seakeeping as a result of their shallow draft and insufficient freeboard, even in the relatively sheltered waters of the Mediterranean Sea. The Navy had little use for the ships, and through the 1880s and 1890s, a series of French naval ministers sought to find a role for the vessels, along with another ten coastal-defense type ironclads built during that period. The ships frequently alternated between the Mediterranean Squadron and the Northern Squadron, the latter stationed in the English Channel, but neither location suited their poor handling.

=== Characteristics ===
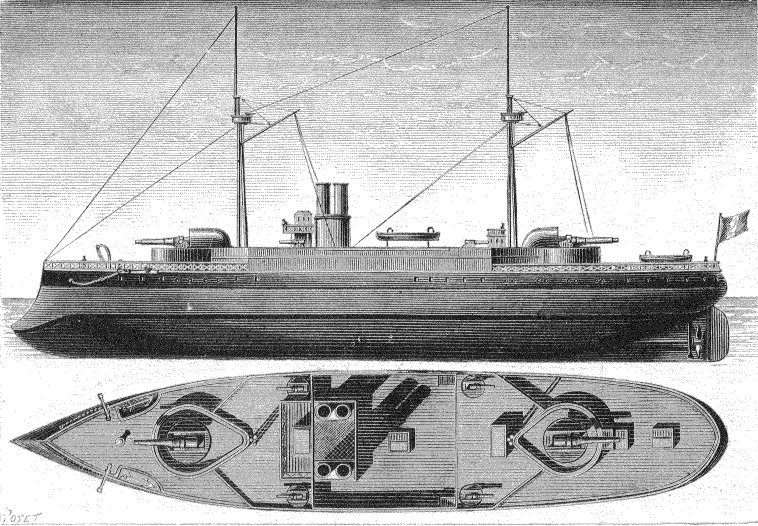
Sketch showing the side and top views of the class

Requin was 88.25 m (289 ft 6 in) long overall, with a beam of 17.78 m (58 ft 4 in) and an average draft of 7.74 m (25 ft 5 in). The vessel displaced 7,767.2 metric tons (7,644.5 long tons; 8,561.9 short tons) and had a relatively low freeboard. Her superstructure was minimal and consisted of a small conning tower. She was fitted with a pair of tripod masts equipped with spotting tops for her main battery guns. The ship's crew consisted of 373 officers and enlisted men.

Her propulsion machinery consisted of two compound steam engines that drove a pair of screw propellers. Steam was provided by twelve coal-burning fire-tube boilers that were vented through a pair of funnels that were placed side by side, just aft of the conning tower. The engines were rated to produce 6,000 indicated horsepower (4,500 kW) for a top speed of 14.5 to 15 knots (26.9 to 27.8 km/h; 16.7 to 17.3 mph). The ship had a storage capacity of 394 t (388 long tons; 434 short tons) of coal, which allowed her to steam for 1,678 nautical miles (3,108 km; 1,931 mi) at a speed of about 11 knots (20 km/h; 13 mph).

Her main armament consisted of two Canon de 42 cm modèle 1875 22-caliber guns, one forward and one aft, mounted on the centerline in barbettes. They were the largest-bore guns ever carried by a French capital ship. These were supported by a secondary battery of four 100 mm (3.9 in) 26.2-cal. M1881 guns carried in individual pivot mounts with gun shields. For defense against torpedo boats, she carried two 65 mm (2.6 in) guns, two 47 mm (1.9 in) M1885 quick-firing guns, one 47 mm Hotchkiss revolver cannon, and ten 37 mm (1.5 in) revolver cannon, all in individual mounts. Her armament was rounded out with four 356 mm (14 in) torpedo tubes in the hull above the waterline, two tubes per side.

The ship was protected with compound armor; her belt was 500 mm (19.7 in) thick amidships, where it protected the ship's propulsion machinery spaces and ammunition magazines. On either end of the central portion, the belt was reduced to 300 mm (11.8 in), and it extended for the entire length of the hull. At even normal loading, the belt was nearly submerged entirely, reducing its effectiveness significantly. Her armor deck was 80 mm (3.1 in) layered on 16 mm (0.63 in) of hull plating, and it curved downward at the sides. The barbettes for the main battery were 450 mm (18 in) thick, layered on top of 30 mm (1.2 in) hull plating, and the tubular supports connecting them to the ammunition magazines were 200 mm (7.9 in). They were fitted with 17 mm (0.7 in) hoods to protect the gun crews from shell fragments. Her conning tower armor was 25 mm (0.98 in) thick, as were the shields for the 100 mm guns.

=== Modifications ===
Requin was extensively modernized between 1898 and 1892, having her armament and propulsion system completely replaced. Her old 420 mm guns were replaced with a pair of 274 mm (10.8 in) Modèle 1893/1896 guns; these were 40-caliber M1893.96 guns that were mounted in fully enclosed, balanced turrets. Her secondary battery was replaced with quick-firing conversions of 100 mm guns, with an additional pair being installed. The light battery was also revised to ten 47 mm guns, and she carried four 37 mm autocannon for use aboard her boats. All four of her torpedo tubes were also removed. Her propulsion system was replaced with a pair of triple-expansion steam engines and twelve Niclausse boilers, which were the water-tube type. Coal storage was increased to 480 t (470 long tons; 530 short tons). Her new propulsion system produced 6,130 ihp (4,570 kW). The heavy compound armor for the main battery barbettes was replaced with 254 mm (10 in) of new, stronger Harvey armor. As a result of these changes, her crew was reduced to 332 officers and men.

== Service history ==
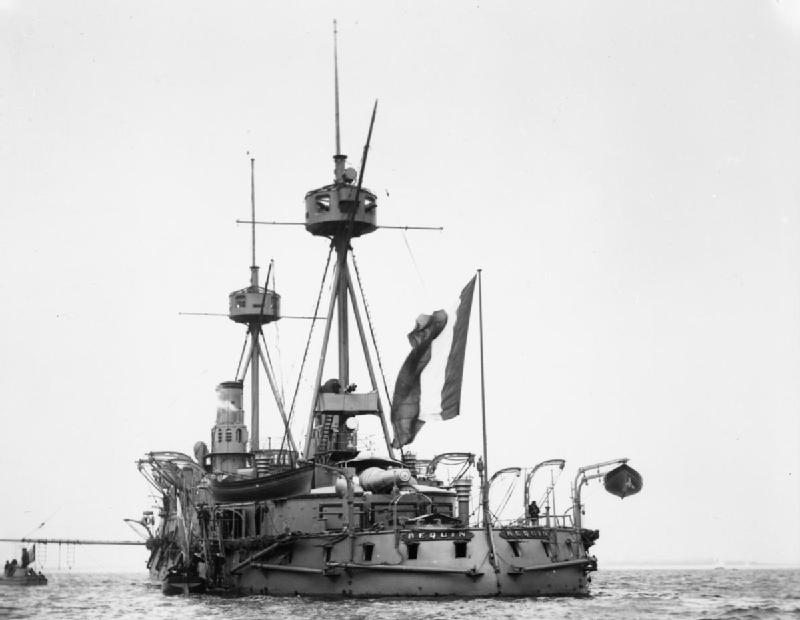
Requin in Britain in 1891

The keel for Requin, the last member of the class to be built, was laid down on 15 November 1878 at the Forges et Chantiers de la Gironde shipyard in Lormont. She was launched on 13 June 1885, and installation of her propulsion machinery began on 15 December to 25 November 1886. The ship was then briefly placed in limited commission to be moved to the Arsenal de Rochefort on 18 December, still incomplete, before continuing on to Brest on the 23rd. There, she was decommissioned on 7 January 1887 and her guns and armor plate were installed. She was commissioned to begin sea trials on 1 December 1888, and her official acceptance trials were carried out between March and May 1889. She was pronounced complete in June, and on 9 July, she was placed in the 2nd category of reserve.

Requin was commissioned for her first period of active service on 1 March 1890 and was assigned to the Northern Squadron. During the fleet maneuvers later that year, Requin served in the 2nd Division of the 1st Squadron of the Mediterranean Fleet. At the time, the division also included the ironclads Marengo and Furieux, the former serving as the squadron flagship for Vice Admiral Charles Duperré. The ships concentrated off Oran, French Algeria on 22 June and then proceeded to Brest, arriving there on 2 July for combined operations with the ships of the Northern Squadron. The exercises began four days later and concluded on 25 July, after which Requin and the rest of the Mediterranean Fleet returned to Toulon. Requin then returned to the Northern Squadron, where she remained for the next five years.

In 1891, a French squadron that included Requin and the ironclads Marengo, Marceau, and Furieux, under the command of Admiral Alfred Gervais was sent to visit Kronstadt, Russia. The voyage, which began on 19 June, was to mark the signing of the Franco-Russian Alliance, which was to occur on 27 August. On the way, the ships visited a number of foreign ports, including Bergen and Larvik, Norway, Copenhagen, Denmark, and Stockholm, Sweden, before arriving in Kronstadt on 23 July. On the voyage back, which began on 4 August, the ships stopped in Finland and Norway before calling in Portsmouth, where Queen Victoria reviewed the ships. They reached Cherbourg on 27 August. During a voyage from Saint-Malo to Brest in 1892, Requin took on significant amounts of water, demonstrating the poor seakeeping of her class; an estimated 15 to 20 long tons (15 to 20 t) of water flooded her forward barbette, and her battery deck was thoroughly washed out. That year, she served as the flagship of the Northern Squadron, which at that time also included Furieux on active duty, with another three ironclads in reserve. In 1893, Requin participated in the fleet's maneuvers in the English Channel, serving in Squadron B, along with the ironclads Suffren and Fulminant. She remained in the unit the following year, which was kept in commission for four months of the year. By that time, the unit consisted of Requin, Suffren, Furieux, and the ironclad Victorieuse.

Requin was relieved by the coastal defense ship Valmy on 39 July 1895, and she was reduced to the 2nd category of reserve at Cherbourg on 8 August, where she was to undergo repairs. The decision was then made to embark on a major reconstruction of the ship, and she was decommissioned on 22 October 1897 for work to begin. Her armament was revised with new main and secondary guns and all of her torpedo tubes were removed. She also received new boilers and engines during the reconstruction. Requin was recommissioned for sea trials on 19 October 1901, decommissioned at some point thereafter, and recommissioned for service on 22 April 1902. She briefly went to Toulon on 18 May, before resuming her assignment to the Northern Squadron later that year, where she was based in Cherbourg with the gunboat Styx as harbor guard ships. She remained in reserve status there for the next several years.

In 1906, she was attached to the Reserve Squadron in the Mediterranean Fleet for the annual maneuvers, along with her sister ships Indomptable, Caïman, the ironclad Hoche, and the pre-dreadnought battleship Charles Martel. On 2 October 1909, Requin was transferred back to Toulon and reclassified as a training ship, where she replaced the protected cruiser Descartes as a support vessel for the naval gunnery school aboard the old transport ship Gironde. She served in this capacity for the next four years, before she was in turn replaced by the pre-dreadnought Charlemagne in 1913. Requin was thereafter placed in special reserve at Bizerte in French Tunisia on 15 October. In January 1914, she was re-designated as a coastal defense ship and work began to restore her to active service.

=== World War I ===
Line-drawing of the Terrible class after refit

On 8 October 1914, shortly after the start of World War I, Requin was mobilized at Bizerte, with the mission of guarding the Suez Canal. She was stationed in Ismailia in December 1914 to help guard the canal from Ottoman attacks. In January 1915, some of the French and British cruisers in the canal zone were sent to patrol the southern Anatolian coast between Mersin and Smyrna, and Requin was moved further north to support them if necessary. Early that month, she was sent to join the patrol itself, but in mid-January, additional cruisers arrived to relieve Requin, which was sent back to the canal to resume guard duties. A berth was dredged in Lake Timsah in the Nile Delta for Requin, where she supported the ground forces defending the northern end of the canal.

Toward the end of the month, an Ottoman force approached the canal, prompting the French to send the protected cruiser D'Entrecasteaux to join Requin in Lake Timsah. The attack came in stages in early February, and on the 3rd, Requin was heavily engaged in helping to repel the assault. She came under fire from Ottoman field artillery batteries, but she neutralized them with her forward 274 mm gun before they could score any hits. The Ottoman attack quickly broke down in the face of the heavy Anglo-French resistance. A small Ottoman force of around 400 men was detected reconnoitering Allied positions in late March, which prompted Requin to prepare for another attack, though no other Ottoman forces were in the area and the reconnaissance party was dispersed.

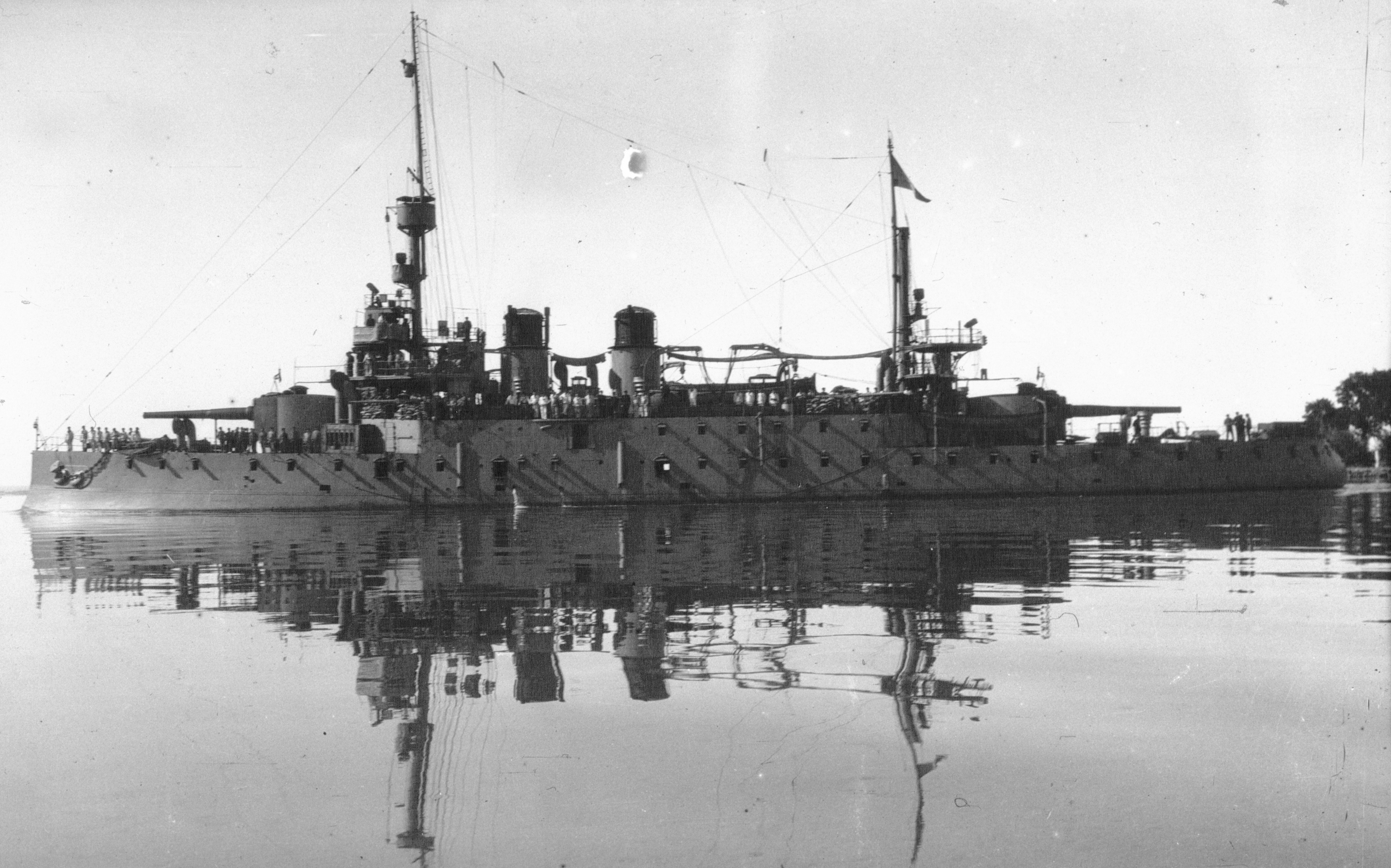
Requin in 1918.

In 1917, Requin was employed offensively, bombarding Ottoman positions along the coast of Ottoman Palestine to support Allied operations. During the Third Battle of Gaza in November, Requin again provided fire support to Allied forces. Aircraft from the British seaplane tender HMS Raven II assisted the French gunners during a bombardment of Wadi el Hesi on 1 November. Ottoman counter-battery fire damaged Requin, and she was later sent to Port Said for repairs that lasted into March 1918. She spent much of the rest of the conflict guarding the canal. Following the end of the war in November, she left Port Said on 17 December and returned to Toulon. Requin was thereafter employed as a gunnery training ship until July 1919, She was decommissioned on 1 August, though demobilization work lasted until 20 August. The ship was then stricken from the naval register on 21 June 1920, before being sold on 2 May 1921 to the ship breaking firm Societé du Matériel Naval du Midi.
