= French ironclad Indomptable =

Ironclad warship of the French Navy

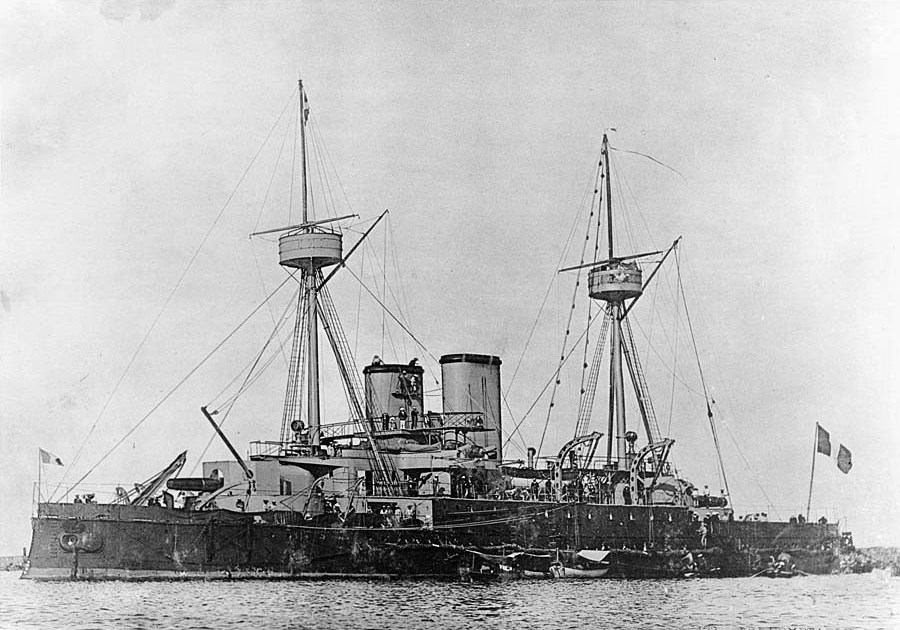
- Indomptable, c. the late 1880s

History

France
- Name: Indomptable
- Laid down: 5 December 1877
- Launched: 18 September 1883
- Commissioned: 10 November 1885
- Stricken: 3 August 1910
- Fate: Broken up, 1927

General characteristics
- Class & type: Terrible-class ironclad
- Displacement: 7,767.2 t (7,644.5 long tons; 8,561.9 short tons)
- Length: 88.25 m (289 ft 6 in) loa
- Beam: 17.78 m (58 ft 4 in)
- Draft: 7.74 m (25 ft 5 in)
- Installed power: 12 × fire-tube boilers; 6,000 ihp (4,500 kW)
- Propulsion: 2 × compound steam engines; 2 × screw propellers
- Speed: 14.5 to 15 kn (26.9 to 27.8 km/h; 16.7 to 17.3 mph)
- Range: 1,678 nmi (3,108 km; 1,931 mi) at 11 knots (20 km/h; 13 mph)
- Complement: 373
- Armament: 2 × 42 cm (16.5 in) guns; 4 × 100 mm (3.9 in) guns; 2 × 47 mm (1.9 in) Hotchkiss guns; 16 × 37 mm (1.5 in) Hotchkiss revolver cannon; 4 × 356 mm (14 in) torpedo tubes
- Armor: Belt: 300 to 500 mm (11.8 to 19.7 in); Deck: 80 mm (3.1 in); Barbettes: 450 mm (17.7 in); Conning tower: 25 mm (0.98 in)

General characteristics (as modernized)
- Installed power: 12 × fire-tube boilers
- Complement: 332
- Armament: 2 × 274 mm (10.8 in) guns; 6 × 100 mm QF guns; 10 × 47 mm guns; 4 × 37 mm guns; 2 × 356 mm torpedo tubes

Indomptable was an ironclad barbette ship built for the French Navy in the late 1870s and early 1880s. She was second member of the Terrible class, which included three other vessels. They were built as part of a fleet plan started in 1872, which by the late 1870s had been directed against a strengthening Italian fleet. The ships were intended for coastal operations, and as such had a shallow draft and a low freeboard, which greatly hampered their seakeeping and thus reduced their ability to be usefully employed after entering service. The main armament consisted of two 420 mm (16.5 in) guns, one fore and one aft, mounted in barbettes—the largest gun ever mounted on a French capital ship. Indomptable was laid down in 1878 and was completed in 1887.

Due to their handling problems, Indomptable and her sister ships saw little active service with the French fleet, instead spending most of their careers in the Reserve Squadron of the Mediterranean Fleet. During this period, the ship spent most of the year out of service with reduced crews, only being reactivated for the fleet maneuvers each year. She was modernized in 1898 with new guns, but by the early 1900s, numerous, more effective pre-dreadnought battleships had been built. These ships displaced Indomptable and her sisters in the Reserve Squadron, and she was reduced to a guard ship in Toulon in 1902. She was used as a hulk at the Arsenal de Rochefort until 1927, when she was broken up.

== Design ==
The Terrible class of barbette ships was designed in the late 1870s as part of a naval construction program that began under the post-Franco-Prussian War fleet plan of 1872. By 1877, the Italian fleet under Benedetto Brin had begun building powerful new ironclads of the Duilio and Italia classes, which demanded a French response, beginning with the ironclad Amiral Duperré of 1877. In addition, the oldest generation of French ironclads, built in the early-to-mid 1860s, were in poor condition and necessitated replacement. The Terrible class was intended to replace old monitors that had been built for coastal defense. Ships of the class were based on the Amiral Baudin-class ironclads, but reduced in size to allow them to operate in shallower waters. They nevertheless carried a larger main battery of two 42-centimeter (16.5 in) guns.

After entering service, the Terrible-class ships were found to have very poor seakeeping as a result of their shallow draft and insufficient freeboard, even in the relatively sheltered waters of the Mediterranean Sea. The Navy had little use for the ships, and through the 1880s and 1890s, a series of French naval ministers sought to find a role for the vessels, along with another ten coastal-defense type ironclads built during that period. The ships frequently alternated between the Mediterranean Squadron and the Northern Squadron, the latter stationed in the English Channel, but neither location suited their poor handling.

=== Characteristics ===
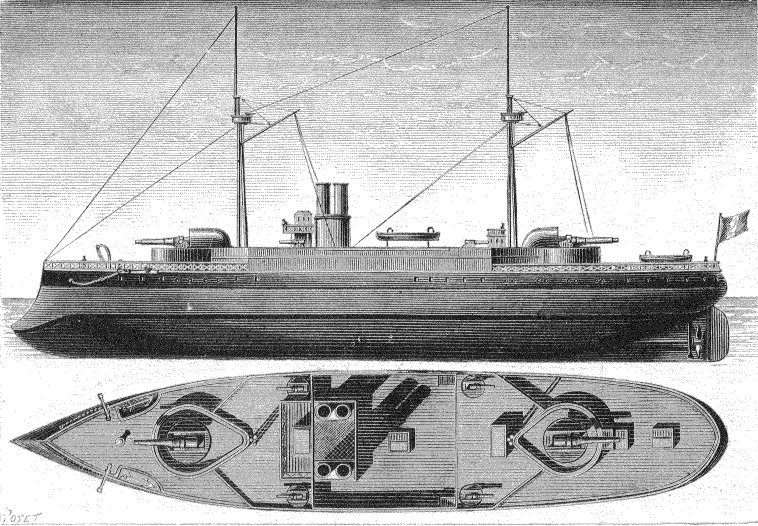
Sketch showing the side and top views of the class

Indomptable was 88.25 m (289 ft 6 in) long overall, with a beam of 17.78 m (58 ft 4 in) and an average draft of 7.74 m (25 ft 5 in). The vessel displaced 7,767.2 metric tons (7,644.5 long tons; 8,561.9 short tons) and had a relatively low freeboard. Her superstructure was minimal and consisted of a small conning tower. She was fitted with a pair of tripod masts equipped with spotting tops for her main battery guns. The ship's crew consisted of 373 officers and enlisted men.

Her propulsion machinery consisted of two compound steam engines that drove a pair of screw propellers. Steam was provided by twelve coal-burning fire-tube boilers that were vented through a pair of funnels that were placed side by side, just aft of the conning tower. The engines were rated to produce 6,000 indicated horsepower (4,500 kW) for a top speed of 14.5 to 15 knots (26.9 to 27.8 km/h; 16.7 to 17.3 mph). The ship had a storage capacity of 394 t (388 long tons; 434 short tons) of coal, which allowed her to steam for 1,678 nautical miles (3,108 km; 1,931 mi) at a speed of about 11 knots (20 km/h; 13 mph).

Her main armament consisted of two Canon de 42 cm modèle 1875 22-caliber guns, one forward and one aft, mounted on the centerline in barbettes. They were the largest-bore guns ever carried by a French capital ship. These were supported by a secondary battery of four 100 mm (3.9 in) 26.2-cal. M1881 guns carried in individual pivot mounts with gun shields. For defense against torpedo boats, she carried two 47 mm (1.9 in) M1885 quick-firing guns and sixteen 37 mm (1.5 in) Hotchkiss revolver cannon, all in individual mounts. Her armament was rounded out with four 356 mm (14 in) torpedo tubes in the hull above the waterline, two tubes per side.

The ship was protected with compound armor; her belt was 500 mm (19.7 in) thick amidships, where it protected the ship's propulsion machinery spaces and ammunition magazines. On either end of the central portion, the belt was reduced to 300 mm (11.8 in), and it extended for the entire length of the hull. At even normal loading, the belt was nearly submerged entirely, reducing its effectiveness significantly. Her armor deck was 80 mm (3.1 in) layered on 16 mm (0.63 in) of hull plating, and it curved downward at the sides. The barbettes for the main battery were 450 mm (18 in) thick, layered on top of 30 mm (1.2 in) hull plating, and the tubular supports connecting them to the ammunition magazines were 200 mm (7.9 in). They were fitted with 17 mm (0.7 in) hoods to protect the gun crews from shell fragments. Her conning tower armor was 25 mm (0.98 in) thick, as were the shields for the 100 mm guns.

=== Modifications ===
Indomptable was modernized several times during her career, primarily in attempts to correct deficiencies in her design that stemmed from excessive weights. She was found to be some 500 t (490 long tons; 550 short tons) overweight, which hampered her seakeeping and reduced stability. The first refit took place at Toulon in early 1897, and involved lowering the funnel casings and removing the mainmast in an attempt to reduce weights high in the ship to improve her stability. She also had twelve new boilers installed.

In 1898, Indomptable returned to the shipyard in Toulon to be rearmed and further lightened. Her heavy 420 mm guns replaced with 40-caliber, 274 mm (10.8 in) Modèle 1893/1896 guns that were mounted in fully enclosed, balanced turrets. The turrets had 270 mm (11 in) thick armor plate on the front and sides, and were mounted on fixed bases that were protected with 210 mm (8.3 in) of steel armor. Her secondary battery was replaced with a quick-firing version of the 100 mm gun, with an additional pair being installed. The light battery was also revised to ten 47 mm guns and four 37 mm autocannon. Two of her torpedo tubes were also removed. The remaining tripod mast was replaced with a lighter pole mast and a new conning tower with 60 m (200 ft) of armor plating on the sides was installed. She also had the bottom strake of the aft-most section of 500 mm belt armor removed to lighten the stern. Work on the ship lasted until 1902. As a result of these changes, her crew was reduced to 332 officers and men.

== Service history ==
Sketch of her sister Caïman

The keel for Indomptable was laid down in Lorient on 5 December 1877. Her completed hull was launched on 18 September 1883, after which fitting-out work was carried out, which included the installation of her propulsion machinery between 3 June 1884 and 20 February 1885. She was commissioned for sea trials on 10 November 1885, though she was not fully manned for her initial testing until 15 June 1886. She moved from Lorient to Brest on 22 June, where she conducted her official trials from July to September. She then departed on 23 October for Toulon on France's Mediterranean coast, arriving there on 31 October. She participated in the fleet's training exercises later that year, during which she was damaged by a gale, forcing her to anchor off Hyères to shelter from the storm. Indomptable was placed in the 1st category of reserve on 20 January 1887 and was reduced to the 2nd category the following year.

In May 1887, Indomptable took part in exercises to practice convoy escort between France and its colonial possessions in French North Africa, where the French Army kept significant forces which would have to be transported back to Europe in the event of a major conflict. Indomptable, along with Amiral Duperré and the ironclads Courbet and Colbert, was assigned to escort a convoy of four simulated troopships on a round trip between Toulon and Algiers, while a squadron of French cruisers and torpedo boats was tasked with interception. The commander of the troopship convoy decided to use bad weather to make the initial crossing, as it would prevent the torpedo boats in the interception force from putting to sea. During the passage however, Indomptable was badly swamped by water, her captain signalling the squadron commander that his ship's barbettes were flooded and she was unable to keep station; the vessel was consequently detached to stop at Hyères before re-joining the fleet at Algiers.

While operating with the Mediterranean Squadron in 1889, Indomptable was again unable to keep pace with the rest of the fleet while cruising from Toulon to Algiers—this time owing to a relatively light westerly wind—while much smaller torpedo boats had no difficulty keeping station. Indomptable was assigned to the Reserve Division—later enlarged to a full squadron—of the Mediterranean Fleet, which was based in Toulon. She served in the unit for the next five years. During this period, the ships were maintained in a state of inactivity with half or two-thirds of their normal crews, only being mobilized for the annual training maneuvers with the rest of the fleet. During the fleet maneuvers of 1891, which began on 23 June, Indomptable was mobilized along with her sisters Caïman and Terrible and five other ironclads. The reserve ships took several days to ready themselves for the exercises before they were able to join the rest of the fleet by 6 July, the maneuvers lasting another five days thereafter.

Line-drawing of the Terrible class after refit

Indomptable served with the Reserve Squadron of the Mediterranean Fleet in 1893; at that time, the squadron also included her sisters Terrible and Caïman and the ironclads Colbert, Friedland, Richelieu, Redoutable, and Trident. In 1894, Indomptable had been reduced to the 2nd Division, Reserve Squadron, along with Colbert. She served in the fleet maneuvers in the Mediterranean that year, which included an initial period of exercises from 1 to 10 July and then larger-scale maneuvers from 17 to 28 July. She remained in the unit the following year, by which time the Reserve Squadron included Terrible, Caïman, Richelieu, and Amiral Duperré. By 1896, she had been removed from the Reserve Squadron. The following year, she began the extensive modernization at Toulon, beginning with the installation of new boilers in early 1897. She carried out sea trials to evaluate the new boilers from 2 to 3 July.

In early 1898, Indomptable was the only member of the class in service, the other three members having been withdrawn to have her armament updated. Similar modernization of Indomptable began later that year, with new main and secondary guns installed and two torpedo tubes removed, the work being completed in 1901. After returning to service in 1902, she was stationed in Toulon as a guard ship. By 1903, all four of the Terrible-class ironclads had been removed from service, their place in the Reserve Squadron having been taken by the pre-dreadnought battleships that had been built in the 1890s. Indomptable returned to the Reserve Squadron in the Mediterranean Fleet for the annual maneuvers in 1906, along with Requin, Caïman, the ironclad Hoche, and the pre-dreadnought battleship Charles Martel. Later that year, she was moved to Cherbourg and placed in reserve. She was struck from the naval register on 3 August 1910 and moved to the Arsenal de Rochefort, where she was used as a mooring hulk for the several years. Indomptable was eventually broken up in 1927.
