= French ironclad Caïman =

Ironclad warship of the French Navy

- Illustration of Caïman

History

France
- Name: Caïman
- Namesake: Caiman
- Laid down: 16 August 1878
- Launched: 21 May 1885
- Commissioned: 1 August 1887
- Stricken: 20 February 1911
- Fate: Broken up, 1928

General characteristics
- Class & type: Terrible-class ironclad
- Displacement: 7,638.8 t (7,518.2 long tons; 8,420.3 short tons)
- Length: 87.74 m (287 ft 10 in) loa
- Beam: 17.78 m (58 ft 4 in)
- Draft: 7.36 m (24 ft 2 in)
- Installed power: 12 × fire-tube boilers; 6,000 ihp (4,500 kW)
- Propulsion: 2 × compound steam engines; 2 × screw propellers
- Speed: 14.5 to 15 kn (26.9 to 27.8 km/h; 16.7 to 17.3 mph)
- Range: 1,678 nmi (3,108 km; 1,931 mi) at 11 knots (20 km/h; 13 mph)
- Complement: 373
- Armament: 2 × 42 cm (16.5 in) guns; 4 × 100 mm (3.9 in) guns; 2 × 47 mm (1.9 in) Hotchkiss guns; 16 × 37 mm (1.5 in) Hotchkiss revolver cannon; 4 × 356 mm (14 in) torpedo tubes
- Armor: Belt: 300 to 500 mm (11.8 to 19.7 in); Deck: 80 mm (3.1 in); Barbettes: 450 mm (17.7 in); Conning tower: 25 mm (0.98 in)

General characteristics (as modernized)
- Installed power: 12 × fire-tube boilers; 4,887 ihp (3,644 kW)
- Speed: 13.38 knots (24.78 km/h; 15.40 mph)
- Complement: 332
- Armament: 2 × 274 mm (10.8 in) guns; 6 × 100 mm QF guns; 10 × 47 mm guns; 4 × 37 mm guns; 2 × 356 mm torpedo tubes

Caïman was an ironclad barbette ship built for the French Navy in the late 1870s and early 1880s. She was the third of four ships of the Terrible class, built as part of a fleet plan started in 1872, which by the late 1870s had been directed against a strengthening Italian fleet. The ships were intended for coastal operations, and as such had a shallow draft and a low freeboard, which greatly hampered their seakeeping and thus reduced their ability to be usefully employed after entering service. Armament consisted of a pair of 420 mm (16.5 in) guns in individual barbettes, the largest gun ever mounted on a French capital ship. Caïman was laid down in 1878 and was completed in 1887.

Due to their handling problems, Caïman and her sister ships saw little active service with the French fleet, instead spending most of their careers in the Reserve Squadron of the Mediterranean Fleet. During this period, the ship spent most of the year out of service with reduced crews, only being reactivated for the fleet maneuvers each year. She was modernized in 1900 with new guns, but by the early 1900s, numerous, more effective pre-dreadnought battleships had been built. These ships displaced Caïman and her sisters in the Reserve Squadron, and she was reduced to a guard ship in Toulon in 1902. She was struck from the naval register in 1911, converted into a hulk, and used in that capacity until 1927, when she was broken up.

== Design ==
The Terrible class of barbette ships was designed in the late 1870s as part of a naval construction program that began under the post-Franco-Prussian War fleet plan of 1872. By 1877, the Italian fleet under Benedetto Brin had begun building powerful new ironclads of the Duilio and Italia classes, which demanded a French response, beginning with the ironclad Amiral Duperré of 1877. In addition, the oldest generation of French ironclads, built in the early-to-mid 1860s, were in poor condition and necessitated replacement. The Terrible class was intended to replace old monitors that had been built for coastal defense. Ships of the class were based on the Amiral Baudin-class ironclads, but reduced in size to allow them to operate in shallower waters. They nevertheless carried a larger main battery of two 42-centimeter (16.5 in) guns.

After entering service, the Terrible-class ships were found to have very poor seakeeping as a result of their shallow draft and insufficient freeboard, even in the relatively sheltered waters of the Mediterranean Sea. The Navy had little use for the ships, and through the 1880s and 1890s, a series of French naval ministers sought to find a role for the vessels, along with another ten coastal-defense type ironclads built during that period. The ships frequently alternated between the Mediterranean Squadron and the Northern Squadron, the latter stationed in the English Channel, but neither location suited their poor handling.

=== Characteristics ===
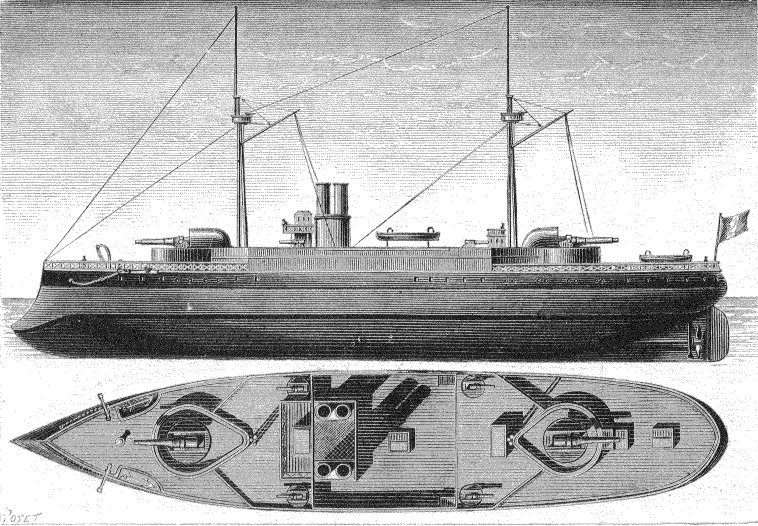
Sketch showing the side and top views of the class

Caïman was 87.74 m (287 ft 10 in) long overall, with a beam of 17.78 m (58 ft 4 in) and an average draft of 7.36 m (24 ft 2 in). The vessel displaced 7,638.8 metric tons (7,518.2 long tons; 8,420.3 short tons) and had a relatively low freeboard. Her superstructure was minimal and consisted of a small conning tower. She was fitted with a pair of tripod masts equipped with spotting tops for her main battery guns. The ship's crew consisted of 373 officers and enlisted men.

Her propulsion machinery consisted of two compound steam engines that drove a pair of screw propellers. Steam was provided by twelve coal-burning fire-tube boilers that were vented through a pair of funnels that were placed side by side, just aft of the conning tower. The engines were rated to produce 6,000 indicated horsepower (4,500 kW) for a top speed of 14.5 to 15 knots (26.9 to 27.8 km/h; 16.7 to 17.3 mph). The ship had a storage capacity of 394 t (388 long tons; 434 short tons) of coal, which allowed her to steam for 1,678 nautical miles (3,108 km; 1,931 mi) at a speed of about 11 knots (20 km/h; 13 mph).

Her main armament consisted of two Canon de 42 cm modèle 1875 22-caliber guns, one forward and one aft, mounted on the centerline in barbettes. They were the largest-bore guns ever carried by a French capital ship. These were supported by a secondary battery of four 100 mm (3.9 in) 26.2-cal. M1881 guns carried in individual pivot mounts with gun shields. For defense against torpedo boats, she carried two 47 mm (1.9 in) M1885 quick-firing guns and sixteen 37 mm (1.5 in) Hotchkiss revolver cannon, all in individual mounts. Her armament was rounded out with four 356 mm (14 in) torpedo tubes in the hull above the waterline, two tubes per side.

The ship was protected with compound armor; her belt was 500 mm (19.7 in) thick amidships, where it protected the ship's propulsion machinery spaces and ammunition magazines. On either end of the central portion, the belt was reduced to 300 mm (11.8 in), and it extended for the entire length of the hull. At even normal loading, the belt was nearly submerged entirely, reducing its effectiveness significantly. Her armor deck was 80 mm (3.1 in) layered on 16 mm (0.63 in) of hull plating, and it curved downward at the sides. The barbettes for the main battery were 450 mm (18 in) thick, layered on top of 30 mm (1.2 in) hull plating, and the tubular supports connecting them to the ammunition magazines were 200 mm (7.9 in). They were fitted with 17 mm (0.7 in) hoods to protect the gun crews from shell fragments. Her conning tower armor was 25 mm (0.98 in) thick, as were the shields for the 100 mm guns.

=== Modifications ===
Caïman was modernized several times during her career, primarily in attempts to correct deficiencies in her design that stemmed from excessive weights. She was found to be some 500 t (490 long tons; 550 short tons) overweight, which hampered her seakeeping and reduced stability. The first refit took place at Toulon in late 1897, and involved lowering the funnel casings and removing the mainmast in an attempt to reduce weights high in the ship to improve her stability. She also had twelve new boilers installed, and on trials carried out in November 1897, she reached 4,887 ihp (3,644 kW) for a top speed of 13.38 knots (24.78 km/h; 15.40 mph).

In 1899, Caïman returned to the shipyard in Toulon to be rearmed and further lightened. Her heavy 420 mm guns replaced with 40-caliber, 274 mm (10.8 in) Modèle 1893/1896 guns that were mounted in fully enclosed, balanced turrets. The turrets had 270 mm (11 in) thick armor plate on the front and sides, and were mounted on fixed bases that were protected with 210 mm (8.3 in) of steel armor. Her secondary battery was replaced with a quick-firing version of the 100 mm gun, with an additional pair being installed. The light battery was also revised to ten 47 mm guns and four 37 mm autocannon. Two of her torpedo tubes were also removed. The remaining tripod mast was replaced with a lighter pole mast and a new conning tower with 60 m (200 ft) of armor plating on the sides was installed. Work on the ship lasted until 1903. As a result of these changes, her crew was reduced to 332 officers and men.

== Service history ==
Caïman was laid down in Toulon on 16 August 1878 and was launched on 21 May 1885. Fitting out work then began, which included the installation of her propulsion machinery from 20 September 1885 to 25 April 1887. She was commissioned on 1 August 1887 to begin sea trials that lasted into 1888. These included tests conducted off the Îles d'Hyères from March to June 1888; her initial testing was interrupted by the annual fleet maneuvers. The ship was activated on 23 August 1888 for the exercises, and she departed the next day to join the rest of the fleet at Hyères. The fleet had assembled by 30 August and the maneuvers ended on 4 September, with the fleet returning to Toulon by the 10th. Caïman then resumed sea trials, which continued to mid-October, and on 16 October she was placed in the 2nd category of reserve. She was placed in full commission on 21 December and replaced her sister Indomptable in the Training Squadron on 25 January 1889. She was then placed in the 2nd category of reserve in 1890.

Line-drawing of the Terrible class after refit

By the early 1890s, Caïman and her sister ships had been assigned to the Reserve Squadron of the Mediterranean Fleet, which was based in Toulon. During this period, the ships were maintained in a state of inactivity with half or two-thirds of their normal crews, only being mobilized for the annual training maneuvers with the rest of the fleet. During the fleet maneuvers of 1891, which began on 23 June, Caïman was mobilized along with her sisters Indomptable and Terrible and five other ironclads. The reserve ships took several days to ready themselves for the exercises before they were able to join the rest of the fleet by 6 July; the maneuvers lasted another five days thereafter.

Caïman served with the Reserve Squadron of the Mediterranean Fleet in 1893; at that time, the squadron also included her sisters Terrible and Indomptable and the ironclads Colbert, Friedland, Richelieu, Redoutable, and Trident. In 1894, Caïman was assigned to the 1st Division, Reserve Squadron, along with Terrible and Richelieu. She served in the fleet maneuvers in the Mediterranean that year, which included an initial period of exercises from 1 to 10 July and then larger-scale maneuvers from 17 to 28 July. She remained in the unit the following year, by which time Indomptable and the ironclad Amiral Duperré had joined it. In 1896, the Reserve Squadron consisted of Amiral Duperré, the flagship, Caïman, Terrible, and Trident.

By 1897, the unit was again revised, now consisting of Caïman, Terrible, Amiral Duperré, and the ironclads Friedland and Dévastation. Caïman was removed from the unit later that year to be modernized, including the installation of new boilers from May to October, and she conducted sea trials in November to evaluate the new boilers. She was briefly assigned to the Coastal Defense Division from 1898 to early 1899, by which time the unit consisted of the ironclads Amiral-Tréhouart, Bouvines, Jemmapes, and Valmy. Later that year, Caïman was reduced to the 2nd category of reserve to be rearmed, which lasted until 1903. By 1903, all four of the Terrible-class ironclads had been removed from service, their place in the Reserve Squadron having been taken by the pre-dreadnought battleships that had been built in the 1890s. In 1906, she returned to the Reserve Squadron in the Mediterranean Fleet for the annual maneuvers, along with Indomptable, Requin, the ironclad Hoche, and the pre-dreadnought battleship Charles Martel. Caïman was then laid up at Cherbourg later that year, where she remained in reserve until being struck from the naval register on 20 February 1911. She was condemned the following month on 22 March and converted into a hulk. She lingered on in that capacity until 1927 before being sold the following year to be broken up at Rochefort.
