= Terrible-class ironclad =

Ironclad warship class of the French Navy

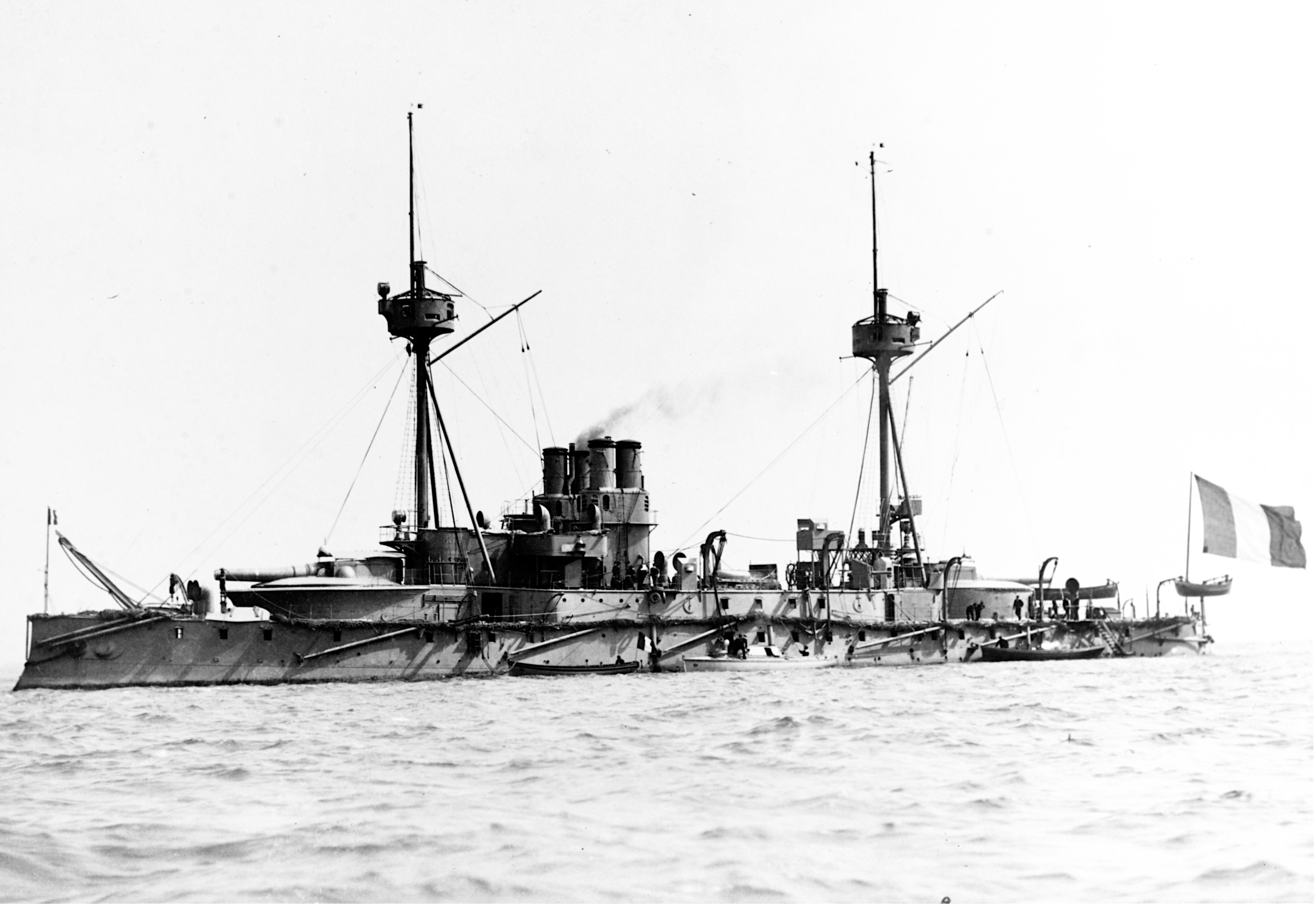
- Requin in Britain in 1892

Class overview
- Builders: Arsenal de Brest; Arsenal de Lorient; Arsenal de Toulon; Forges et Chantiers de la Gironde
- Operators: French Navy
- Preceded by: Vauban class
- Succeeded by: Amiral Baudin class
- Built: 1877–1888
- Completed: 4
- Scrapped: 4

General characteristics
- Type: Barbette ship
- Displacement: 7,767.2 t (7,644.5 long tons; 8,561.9 short tons)
- Length: 88.25 m (289 ft 6 in) loa
- Beam: 17.78 m (58 ft 4 in)
- Draft: 7.74 m (25 ft 5 in)
- Installed power: 12 × fire-tube boilers; 6,000 ihp (4,500 kW)
- Propulsion: 2 × compound steam engines; 2 × screw propellers
- Speed: 14.5 to 15 kn (26.9 to 27.8 km/h; 16.7 to 17.3 mph)
- Range: 1,678 nmi (3,108 km; 1,931 mi) at 11 knots (20 km/h; 13 mph)
- Complement: 373
- Armament: 2 × 42 cm (16.5 in) guns; 4 × 100 mm (3.9 in) guns; 2 × 47 mm (1.9 in) Hotchkiss guns; 16 × 37 mm (1.5 in) Hotchkiss revolver cannon; 4 × 356 mm (14 in) torpedo tubes
- Armor: Belt: 300 to 500 mm (11.8 to 19.7 in); Deck: 80 mm (3.1 in); Barbettes: 450 mm (17.7 in); Conning tower: 25 mm (0.98 in)

The Terrible class was a group of four ironclad barbette ships built for the French Navy in the late 1870s and early 1880s. The class consisted of Terrible, Indomptable, Caïman, and Requin, and is sometimes referred to as the Indomptable class. They were built as part of a fleet plan started in 1872 after the Franco-Prussian War and were designed in response to the German Sachsen class of barbette ships. The Terribles were scaled down versions of the Amiral Baudin class, with one less main gun, though they were of significantly larger caliber. Because the ships were intended for operations against the German fleet in the shallow Baltic Sea, they had a low draft and freeboard, which greatly hampered their seakeeping and thus reduced their ability to be usefully employed after entering service. Armament consisted of a pair of 420 mm (16.5 in) guns in individual barbettes, which were the largest guns ever mounted on a French capital ship.

Because of their poor seakeeping, the ships had limited careers, seeing active service for only a few years in the late 1880s and early 1890s. Thereafter, they spent much of their time in reserve, being activated only for fleet maneuvers. Requin made one voyage abroad to visit Russia and Great Britain in 1891. The ships were modernized in the late 1890s, receiving new guns, and in the case of Requin, new engines and boilers and some upgrades to her armor. Terrible was sunk as a target ship in 1909, and only Requin was still in service by the start of World War I in 1914. She was stationed as a guard ship in the Suez Canal, and she helped to repel an Ottoman attack in February 1915. She was scrapped in 1920 and the other two vessels were discarded in 1927–1928.

== Design ==
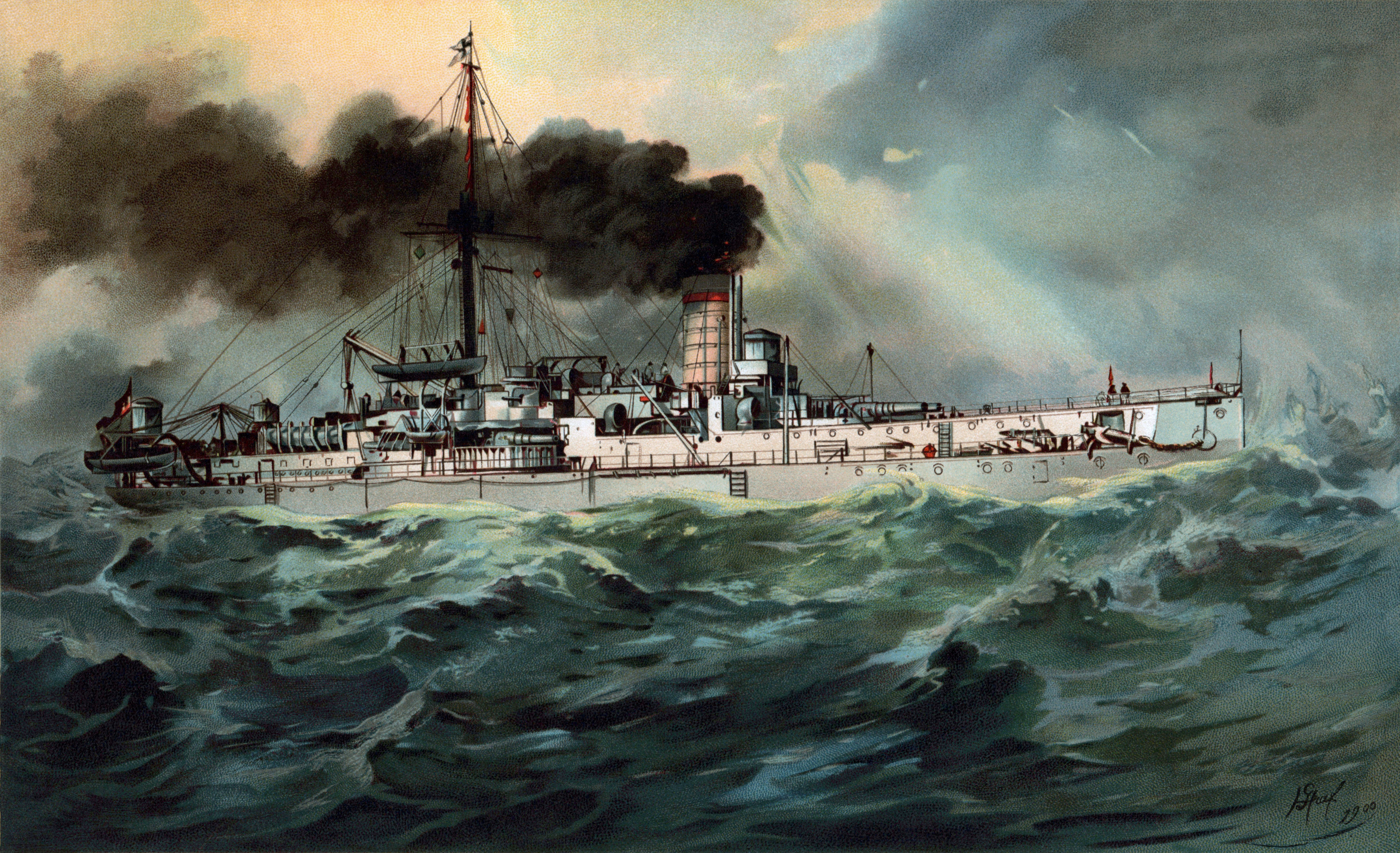
The Sachsen class prompted the Terrible design

The Terrible class of ironclad barbette ships, sometimes called the Indomptable class, was designed in the late 1870s as part of a naval construction program that had begun under the post-Franco-Prussian War fleet plan of 1872. Initially, the French built two types of armored capital ships, the first a series of high-freeboard barbette ships, and the second being smaller coast defense ships descended from the monitors that had been built in the 1860s. By 1877, the Italian fleet under Benedetto Brin had begun building powerful new ironclads of the Duilio and Italia classes, which demanded a French response. Under the direction of Admiral Louis Pierre Alexis Pothuau, the French embarked on a construction program beginning with the high-freeboard Amiral Duperré of 1877, followed by the Amiral Baudin-class ironclads. In addition, the oldest generation of French ironclads, wooden-hulled vessels built in the early-to-mid 1860s, were in poor condition and necessitated replacement. Gun size during this period increased dramatically, driven principally by the desire to keep up with Italy, which had begun to use massive 450 mm (17.7 in) guns it its latest ironclads.

Further developments abroad complicated French capital ship design work; the development of the German Sachsen-class ironclads gave another potential adversary to consider. These were coastal defense vessels that were significantly more powerful than the French coastal defense ships that had already been built under the 1872 plans, the Tonnerre and Tempête classes. Amiral Duperré and the Amiral Baudins, powerful enough to defeat the Sachsens but significantly larger than previous generations of French ironclads, had too deep a draft to allow them to comfortably operate in the Baltic Sea.

Design work on the new ships began with a proposal from the naval architect Victorin Sabattier, then the Director of Materiel, which the French Naval Minister, Albert Gicquel des Touches, forwarded to the Conseil des travaux (Board of Construction) on 26 June 1877. Sabattier designed a ship with either one 100 t (98-long-ton; 110-short-ton) gun or two 50 t (49-long-ton; 55-short-ton) guns in a barbette forward, with 600 mm (23.6 in) armor plate for its belt armor to counter the new Italian ironclads. Gicquel des Touches was primarily concerned with producing a vessel superior to the Tonnerre class. The Conseil could not come to an agreement initially, but during a meeting on 7 August, the members noted the very strong armor protection, which was the thickest of any vessel then afloat. They disliked the use of a single gun mount forward, as it would have a large blind arc astern, and they requested solutions to the problem.

By October, a new 75 t (74-long-ton; 83-short-ton), 420 mm (16.5 in) gun had been developed by the Navy's Artillery Directorate, which Sabattier adopted as there was no 100-ton gun available. To address the Conseil's concerns, he added a second barbette aft so the ships could engage targets ahead or astern. Gicquel des Touches approved the plans on 31 October and authorized construction of the first two vessels, Terrible and Indomptable; Sabattier submitted an alternate design the following year with slightly different hull lines at the stern, which Pothuau, who was by then once again the naval minister, approved on 5 July 1878. This vessel became Caïman. A fourth vessel, Requin, was authorized in September.

The class suffered from significant design faults, most significantly the arrangement of the guns; because they were placed on the centerline, they were arranged for fighting on the broadside. But their short belt, which was almost completely submerged under service conditions, did not sufficiently protect them from damage that would be inflicted in a prolonged engagement between two lines of battle.

=== General characteristics and machinery ===
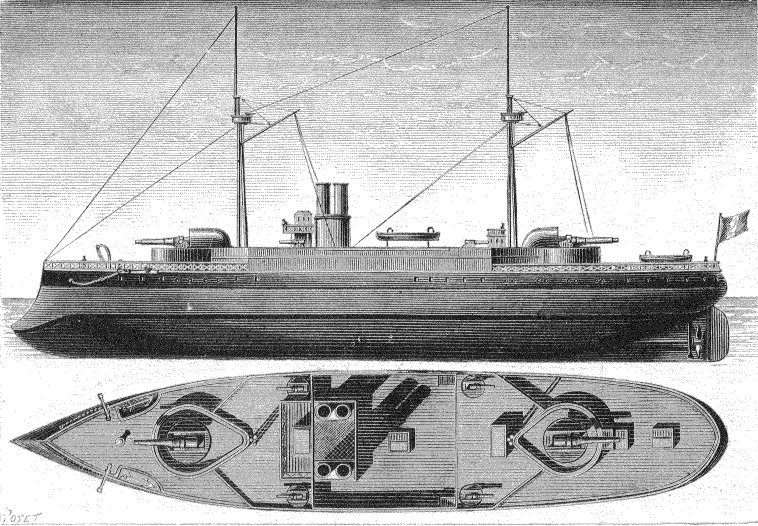
Sketch showing the side and top views of the class

The ships of the Terrible class, with the exception of Caïman, were 82.8 m (271 ft 8 in) long between perpendiculars, 84.8 m (278 ft 3 in) long at the waterline, and 88.25 m (289 ft 6 in) long overall. They had a beam of 17.52 m (57 ft) at the waterline and an average draft of 7.74 m (25 ft 5 in). They displaced 7,767.2 t (7,644.5 long tons; 8,561.9 short tons). Caïman had a slightly different hull shape at her stern; she was 82,8 m between perpendiculars, 84.7 m (277 ft 11 in) at the waterline, and 87.7 m (287 ft 9 in) overall. She had a beam of 17.54 m (57 ft 7 in), and her draft decreased to 7.36 m (24 ft 2 in); her displacement was 7,638.8 t (7,518.2 long tons; 8,420.3 short tons). The ships were significantly overweight when they entered service, being some 500 t (490 long tons; 550 short tons) too heavy, which hampered stability.

Their hulls were divided into eleven or twelve watertight compartments by transverse bulkheads. The ships had a fairly low freeboard and a pronounced ram bow. Their superstructure was fairly minimal, consisting of a small conning tower with a bridge atop. They were fitted with a pair of tripod masts equipped with spotting tops for their main battery guns. Terrible and Requin were fitted with four searchlights, while the other pair received six. The crew consisted of 373 officers and enlisted men. Steering was controlled with a single rudder. The ships suffered from very poor seakeeping owing to their shallow draft, severely handicapping their usefulness in service.

Their propulsion machinery consisted of two compound steam engines, each driving a single screw propeller, with steam provided by twelve coal-burning fire-tube boilers in the first three ships. Requin only received ten of the boilers. The ships' boilers were ducted into four small funnels placed in two pairs, side by side, directly astern of the conning tower. Indomptable and Caïman had their pairs of funnels fully encased, which gave them the appearance of having two large funnels side by side. All four ships' engines were rated to produce 6,000 indicated horsepower (4,500 kW) for a top speed of 14.5 to 15 knots (26.9 to 27.8 km/h; 16.7 to 17.3 mph). Coal storage amounted to 394 t (388 long tons; 434 short tons), which allowed them to steam for 1,678 nautical miles (3,108 km; 1,931 mi) at a speed of about 11 knots (20 km/h; 13 mph).

=== Armament and armor ===
Sketch of Caïman

Their main armament consisted of two Canon de 42 cm modèle 1875 (16.5 in) guns, one forward and one aft, mounted on the centerline in barbettes. These were 22-caliber guns, though Terrible's guns had to be shortened to 19.35 calibers after initial testing revealed cracks at the muzzle. The rate of fire of these guns was very slow, even for large-caliber guns of the period; it was estimated in 1891 that the average time to reload one of the guns was eight minutes. They were the largest guns ever carried by a French capital ship. These guns were supported by a secondary battery of four 100 mm (3.9 in) M1881 26.2-caliber guns carried in individual pivot mounts with gun shields. For defense against torpedo boats, they carried a variety of light guns. Indomptable and Caïman two 47 mm (1.9 in) M1885 quick-firing guns and sixteen 37 mm (1.5 in) Hotchkiss revolver cannon, all in individual mounts. Terrible and Requin had two 65 mm (2.6 in) guns, two M1885 gun, a 47 mm Hotchkiss revolver cannon, along with ten of the 37 mm revolvers. All four members of the class had four 356 mm (14 in) torpedo tubes, which were mounted in the hull above the waterline, two per broadside.

Terrible was protected with mild steel armor, while the other ships received newer compound armor. Their belt extended for the entire length of the hull and was 500 mm (19.7 in) thick in the central portion, where it protected the propulsion machinery and the ammunition magazines. The belt tapered to 400 mm (16 in) on the bottom edge. The bow section was reduced to 300 mm (11.8 in) at the waterline and 250 mm (9.8 in) on the bottom edge, while the stern section was 300 mm at the waterline and 200 mm (8 in) at the bottom edge, though Caïman's different stern lines precluded the inclusion of the lower strake of 200 mm armor. The height of the belt was 2.2 m (7 ft 3 in), but at even normal loading, the belt was nearly submerged entirely, reducing its effectiveness significantly.

The barbettes for the main battery were 450 mm (17.7 in) thick and the supporting tubes that connected them to the ammunition magazines were 200 mm; these extended down to where they met the armor deck, which was connected to the top of the belt. The barbette guns were covered with 17 mm (0.67 in) hoods to protect the gun crews from shell fragments. The deck consisted of 80 mm (3.1 in) of either iron or mild steel over another layer of 16 mm (0.63 in) of hull plating, which sloped downward at the sides to provide additional protection against incoming fire; the thickness of the sloped deck remained the same except for Indomptable, which was reduced to 60 mm (2.4 in). The sides of their conning towers were also 25 mm, as were the shields for the 100 mm guns.

=== Modifications ===
Line-drawing of the Terrible class after refit

Over the course of the 1880s and early 1890s, all four ships received updated M1885 and later M1887 torpedoes for their torpedo tubes. In 1892, all four ships had their 100 mm guns replaced with quick-firing conversions of the same pattern of gun. Caïman's light battery was revised in 1896 to one 65 mm gun, six 47 mm QF guns, six 37 mm QF guns in her upper fighting tops, and sixteen 37 mm revolver cannon.

All four ships were extensively modernized between 1897 and 1903, with the work generally carried out in two stages. The primary changes being the replacement of their main battery guns and the installation of new boilers. Terrible received a pair of 340 mm (13.4 in) Modèle 1893 guns; these were 35-caliber guns, and were installed in her existing barbettes, though 504 mm (19.8 in) frontal gun shields were installed. The other three members of the class received two 274 mm (10.8 in) Modèle 1893/1896 40-caliber guns that were mounted in fully enclosed, balanced turrets. The turrets were protected with 274.4 mm (10.80 in) of Harvey armor on the sides, and were mounted on fixed based with 210 mm (8.3 in) of armor plate. Indomptable, Caïman, and Requin all received another pair of 100 mm quick-firing guns. The ships' light batteries were also revised. All four ships had ten 47 mm guns; Terrible and Requin received three 37 mm QF guns, along with a single 37 mm (1.5 in) Maxim gun for Terrible, while Indomptable and Caïman each had four of the 37 mm QF guns. Terrible and Requin lost all four of their torpedo tubes, while the other two vessels only had two removed.

All four ships received new boilers, though only Requin received more modern water-tube boilers of the Niclausse type. Requin also had her compound engines replaced with more powerful triple-expansion steam engines. On trials carried out after their refits, Caïman reached 4,887 ihp (3,644 kW) for 13.38 knots (24.78 km/h; 15.40 mph), while Terrible made 4,238 ihp (3,160 kW) for 13.5 knots (25.0 km/h; 15.5 mph). Requin's new engines were rated to produce 6,130 ihp (4,570 kW), but trial figures are not recorded. Attempts to lighten the vessels to improve their stability included the replacement of their tripod masts with lighter pole masts, and in the case of Indomptable and Caïman, the simple removal of their mainmast. Those two vessels also had their funnel casing lowered. Indomptable had the aft-most bottom strake of her belt armor replaced with wood to lighten her stern. New conning towers were installed with 60 mm (2.4 in) of armor plate on 20 mm (0.79 in) of hull plating, with the exception of Requin, which received 136 mm (5.4 in) of armor on her new tower. As a result of these changes, the standard crew for all four ships was reduced to 332 officers and men.

Requin—the only member of the class still in active service—had had most of her light guns removed during World War I. By 1919, her armament consisted of the two 274 mm guns, six 100 mm guns, and four 47 mm guns.

== Ships ==
Name	Builder	Laid down	Launched	Commissioned
Terrible	Arsenal de Brest, Brest	10 December 1877	29 March 1881	15 July 1886
Indomptable	Arsenal de Lorient, Lorient	5 December 1877	18 September 1883	10 November 1885
Caïman	Arsenal de Toulon, Toulon	16 August 1878	21 May 1885	1 August 1887
Requin	Forges et Chantiers de la Gironde, Lormont	15 November 1878	13 June 1885	1 December 1888

== Service history ==
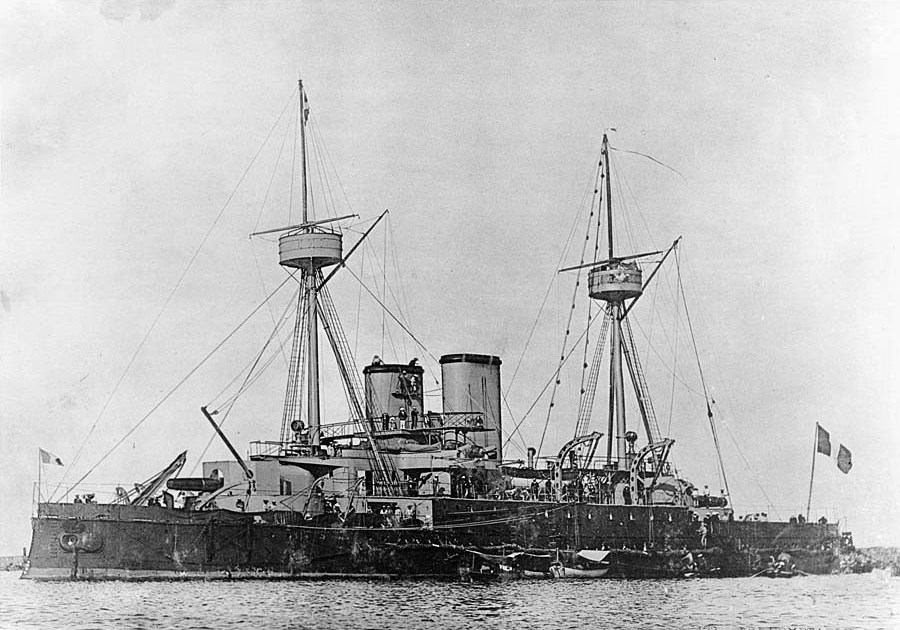
Indomptable in port in the late 1880s

The insufficient freeboard of the Terrible class significantly reduced their seaworthiness and frequently caused problems for the ships while at sea. Indomptable had repeated problems in the late 1880s during fleet operations in the Mediterranean Sea, and Requin experienced problems with flooding while steaming in the English Channel since her low forecastle proved incapable of keeping water out. Owing to their poor seakeeping, they proved to be difficult to employ for the French fleet, since they could only be used in sheltered coastal waters. As a result, their careers were limited, though they did see brief periods of active service in the Mediterranean Fleet and the Northern Squadron, the latter confined to the English Channel. From 1891 to 1897, Terrible, Indomptable, and Caïman had been assigned to the Reserve Squadron of the Mediterranean Fleet, though not always at the same time. The ships remained in service only for the annual fleet maneuvers; the rest of the year they were kept in reserve with reduced crews.

Requin spent her early career in the Northern Squadron, and during this period, made one voyage abroad to visit Russia and Great Britain in 1891. All four members of the class were refitted in the late 1890s, the primary alterations being a new battery of main and secondary guns, though Requin received a more extensive reconstruction that included a new propulsion system and some armor improvements. Terrible was the only member of the class to be reactivated by 1900, and Indomptable was employed as a guard ship in Toulon in 1902. Terrible was laid up that year, and by 1903, all members of the class were out of service, as a series of pre-dreadnought battleships had been built, taking their places in the squadrons of the fleet. Indomptable, Caïman, and Requin returned to active service in 1906 for that year's fleet maneuvers. Terrible was stricken from the naval register in 1909 and sunk as a target ship in August that year. Indomptable and Caïman were struck from the register in 1910 and 1911, respectively, and thereafter hulked.

Requin was the only member of the class to see action during World War I, being stationed in the Suez Canal to defend it against attacks from the Ottoman Empire; she helped repulse an attack in February 1915 and dueled with Ottoman field artillery. She was also used to support Allied offensives along the coast of Ottoman Palestine. She was briefly used as a training ship in 1919 before ultimately being sold for scrap in 1921. Indomptable and Caïman lingered on in the French Navy's inventory until 1927 and 1928, respectively, when they too were broken up.
