= Canon de 42 cm modèle 1875 =

Naval gun by Schneider-Creusot

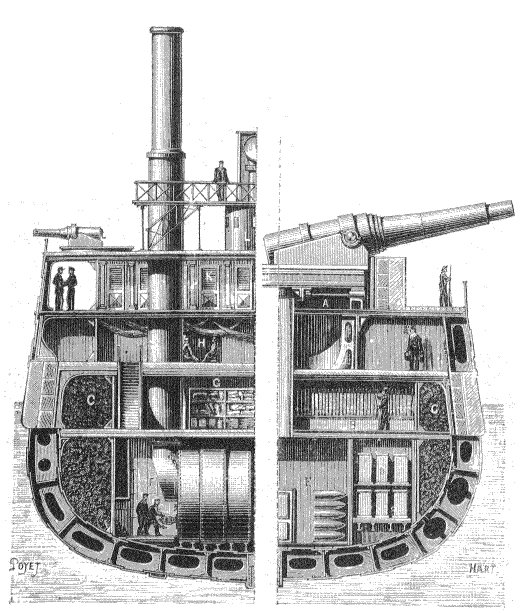
- Cross-section of the battleship Indomptable
- Type: Naval artillery

Service history
- In service: 1881-1902

Production history
- Manufacturer: Schneider-Creusot and Ruelle Foundry
- No. built: 8

Specifications
- Mass: 76,785 kg
- Length: 8,895 mm (29.2 ft) (L/22)
- Caliber: 420 mm
- Elevation: 7 ° to 10°
- Muzzle velocity: 530 m/s
- Effective firing range: 9100

The Canon de 42 cm modèle 1875 or canon de 420 mm modèle 1875 was a built-up gun made by Schneider-Creusot and the Ruelle Foundry in the late nineteenth century. This gun was the highest calibre gun put into service on a vessel of the French Navy. Together with the canon de 450 mm/45 modèle 1920 and the 431 mm modèle 1939 it was one of the few guns over 400 mm calibre developed for the Marine Nationale.

== Predecessors ==
=== The Canon de 42 C ===
The Canon de 42 C model 1867 was developed during the Second French Empire. It followed from the development of the hooped cast iron Modèle 1864-66 guns, like the Canon de 27 C modèle 1864. In March 1867, the Ruelle Foundry cast two of these guns. This cast iron gun reinforced with steel hoops weighed 38,000 kg. It was mounted on a turntable carriage and slide. With a charge of 50 kg of powder, it fired a shot of 250 kg. The gun was used in studies for the defence of ports and harbors.

One of these guns was exhibited at the 1867 Exposition Universelle in Paris. Here it competed with the British and Krupp monster guns.

=== Modèle 1870 and 1870-1875 ===
The French naval artillery saw many innovations after 1855. After the Canon de 42 C of 38t two more projects for 420 mm guns were started. The first was the 1870 model which became the 1870-1875 model. Finally, this evolved to the model 1875.

At the time, several European countries were in a race to increase the performance of their naval guns. Between 1870 and 1880, the preferred way to do this was to increase the caliber. The development of the 42 cm gun fit this pattern. Later on, barrels became much longer and caliber were decreased for a while.

== The Canon de 42 cm modèle 1875 ==
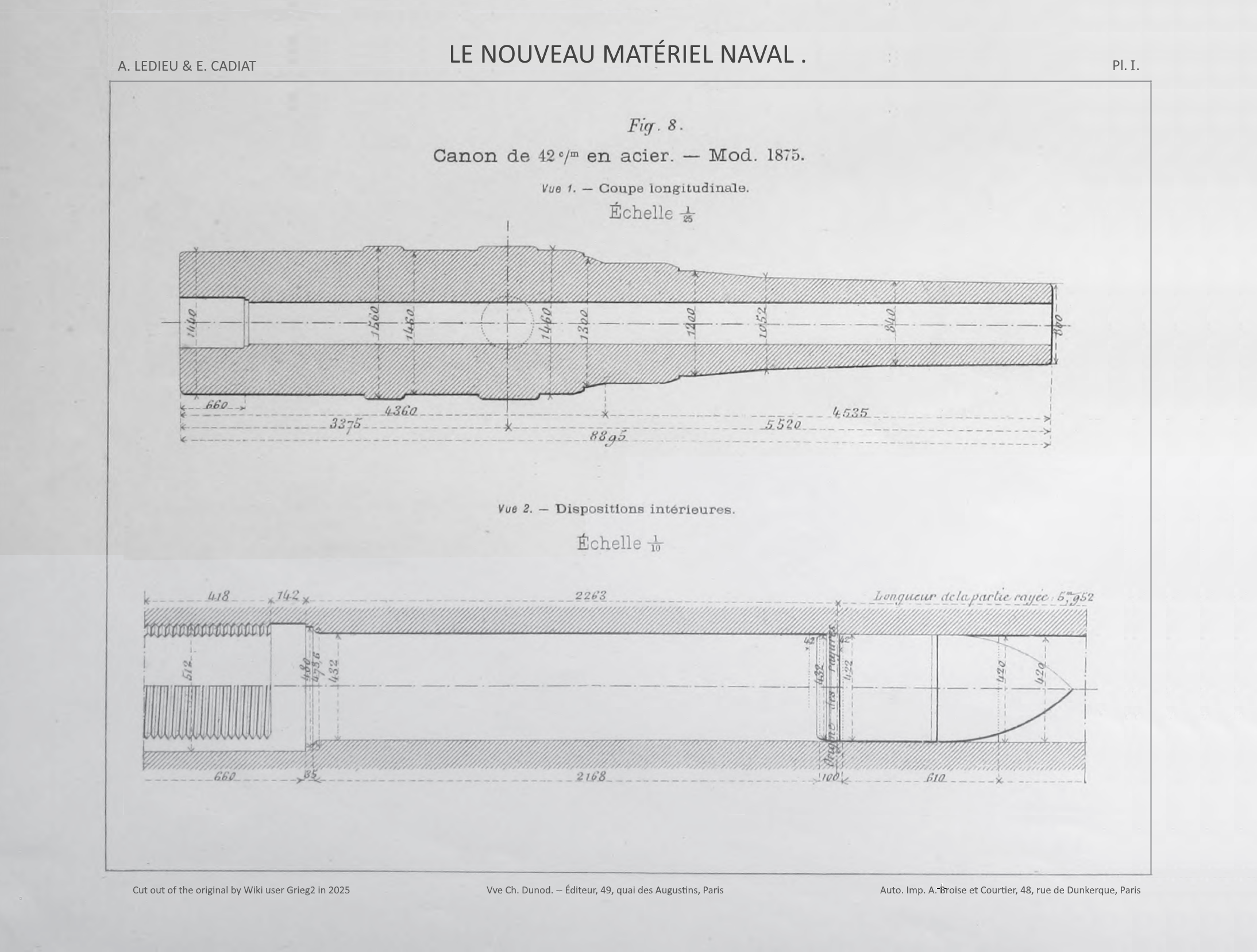
Profile of the French steel 42 cm gun model 1875

Schematic overview of the canon de 42 cm modèle 1875

The Canon de 42 cm modèle 1875 was based on the series of naval guns known as modèle 1875–1879. These were all made entirely of steel. The studies for the Canon de 42 cm modèle 1875 started in 1878.

Of the first four guns, one was partly made of cast iron. It therefore weighed much more at 100t. This particular gun was only meant for ballistic trials at Gâvres.

=== Construction ===
The steel barrel was cast and forged by Schneider-Creusot. It was then transported to the Ruelle Foundry which assembled the guns and made its Rifling.

At Ruelle, the guns were bored. A steel tube was then inserted in the back part of the gun, where the breech and the powder chamber were. The barrel was reinforced by three layers of steel hoops. These were shrunk onto the barrel and increased its resistance to pressure, which could be over 2,800 kgf per cm^{2}. The head of the breech was then fit so it could be inserted into the barrel. Finally, a total of 84 grooves were drawn inside the barrel.

=== Operation ===
Opening the breech of the gun was done in three phases. The first step was to rotate the breech block on its axis by 60°. The breech block was then shifted backwards. The final step was to rotate the breech block so the projectile and the cartridge could be inserted. Closing the breech was done in reverse order. The gun could then be fired.

Moving the breech block was effected by two hydraulic presses. One was used to open the breech, the other to close it. The breech loading system was called the Farcot system. The projectiles were stored in bunkers. From there, they were transported to the gun by a rail trolley and an elevator that brought up the charge. A hydraulic crane then brought the projectile and two cartridges to the upper gun carriage.

At point-blank range, the 22 caliber long gun could penetrate 825 mm of iron or 550 mm of steel. Trials at Le Havre in 1891 showed a capability to penetrate 960 mm at point blank range and 780 mm at 2000 m.

=== Service ===
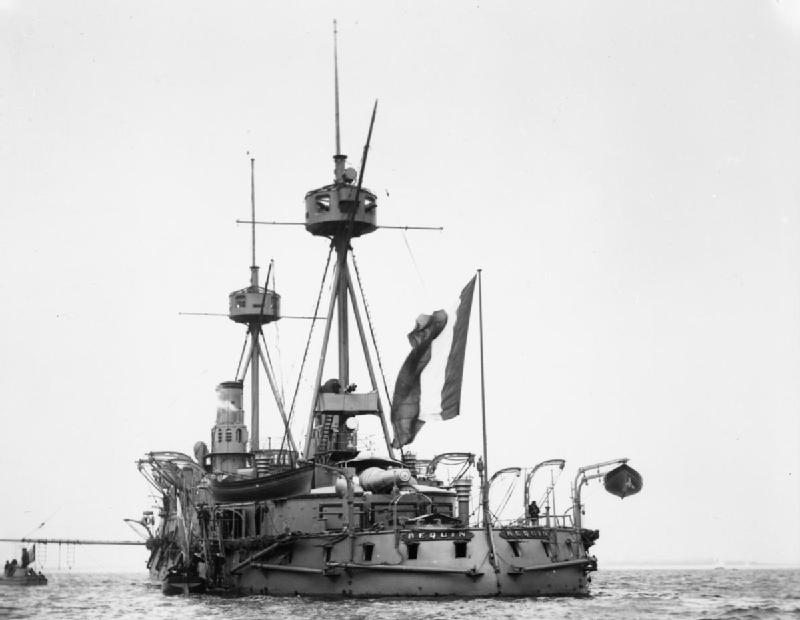
View of the gun on board Requin.

Production of the Canon de 42 cm modèle 1875 was limited to eight guns. The guns were used on the four ships of the Terrible-class. These were ironclads for use in coastal waters. Each had two single pieces. The guns were placed in barbettes on the forecastle and quarterdeck protected by 15 mm of armor. Each barbette could turn 135° to either side. Elevation was between — 7° and + 10°.

Two guns were shortened to a length of 19.75 calibers. This was done after an accident during shooting trials at Ruelle. These guns were used on the Terrible. The six longer guns were installed on Indomptable, Caïman and Requin. Each vessel had 110 steel and 10 cast iron grenades.

The carriage was modified in 1896–1897. The modifications were done to allow night-time aiming and firing.

The Terrible class ships were modernized from 1900 to 1902. The modernization also meant that the 42 cm gun was replaced by the Canon de 274 modèle 1893/1896 mounted in a closed turret.

=== Other uses and German intelligence ===
In 1916, the guns were the subject of a study that investigated whether they could be transformed to 520 mm shell guns.

During World War I, German intelligence reported the "Canon de 420 M 1875" as still in service in the French army. It also reported a wrong length and range for the gun.

=== Ammunition ===
There were two kinds of grenades for the 42 cm gun. The steel armor piercing grenade and the regular ogive cast iron grenade. Both were propelled by two separate cartridges filled with prismatic gunpowder. The charge was later replaced by smokeless powder.

Kind of grenade	Weight of the projectile (kg)	Velocity (m/s)	Explosive charge (kg)	Propellant charge (kg)
Ogive cast iron grenade	650	530	36	274
Steel armor piercing grenade	780	530	11	274

== See also ==
=== Related pages ===
- The Royal Arsenal's RML 16-inch 80-ton gun
- Elswick Ordnance Company 100-ton gun
- Krupp's 35.5 cm MRK L/22.5

=== External links ===
- Atlas du nouveau matériel naval, Ernest Cadiat, Alfred Ledieu, 1889,PLANCHE XIX. Appareils hydrauliques pour la manœuvre de la culasse mobile du canon de 42 cm (pl.19)
