= Tripod mast =

Type of mast used on warships

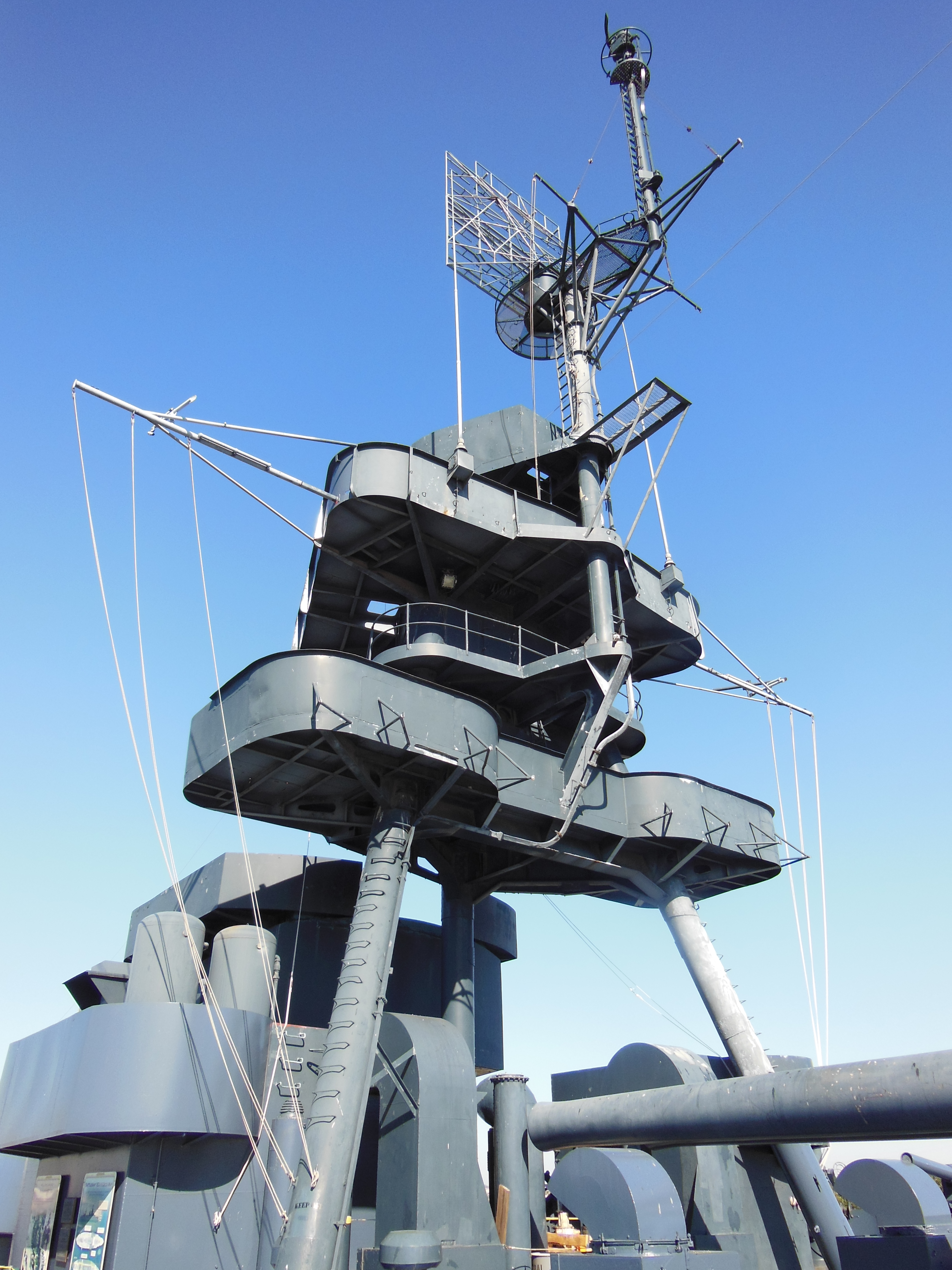
Tripod mast, as here on USS Texas, were strong enough to carry heavy equipment such as searchlights, radar and the spotting top high up

The tripod mast is a type of mast used on warships from the Edwardian era onwards, replacing the pole mast. Tripod masts are distinctive using two large (usually cylindrical) support columns spread out at angles to brace another (usually vertical) column.

== History ==
The masts were intended to provide a raised platform for visual observers and for fire control equipment, elevated up above the main hull for visibility and to reduce the risk of shell damage to the gear and crews. These masts used three large cylindrical tubes or columns to form the mast. The tubes provided structural cross-bracing and a stiff structure, but were still structurally efficient and reasonably lightweight.

Tripod masts were predated by pole masts. The idea dates at least as far back as the French Terrible-class ironclads, built in the late 1870s, which used a pair of tripod masts.

The Royal Navy moved to the tripod mast from pole masts with their last pre-dreadnought (Lord Nelson class) and the first dreadnought battleship, HMS Dreadnought (launched in 1906) and thereafter in their later battleships and battlecruisers.

The United States Navy preferred the lightweight lattice mast, which used an array of thin columns at angles, crossing each other in a double helical spiral configuration in a form of hyperboloid structure. These were used on their first dreadnought battleships launched in 1908. The US were the only significant users of lattice masts. Eventually, these structures proved less structurally sound than intended. On January 15, 1918, USS Michigan had a lattice mast collapse in an intense storm. Beginning in the 1930s, the US Navy started refitting their battleships and other capital ships with the more robust tripod mast design.

The tripod mast structure continued in use until stealth designs started to move away from open masts entirely in the 2000s. The Royal Navy began using plated-in masts or "macks" in the early 1960s, either as new construction or by refit, such as that of HMS Salisbury in 1962.

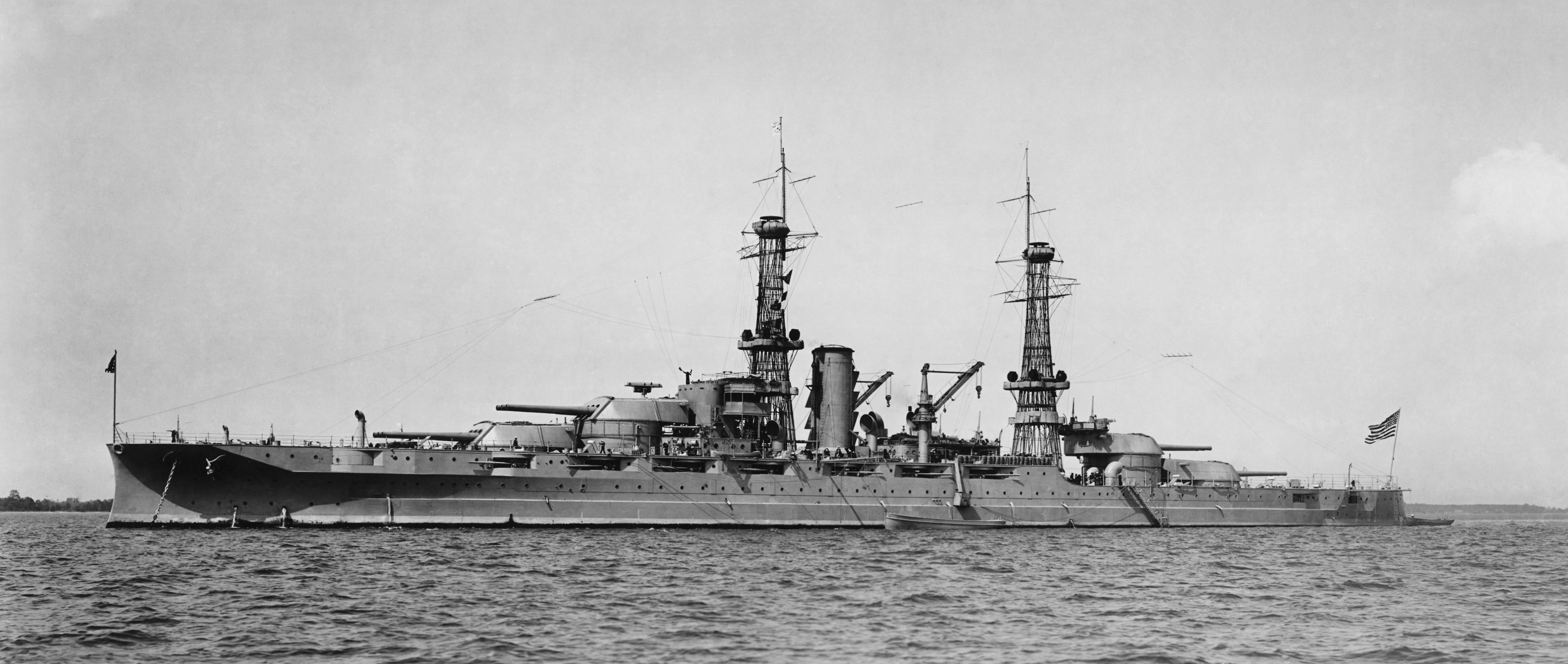
USS Arizona's original 1923 lattice masts

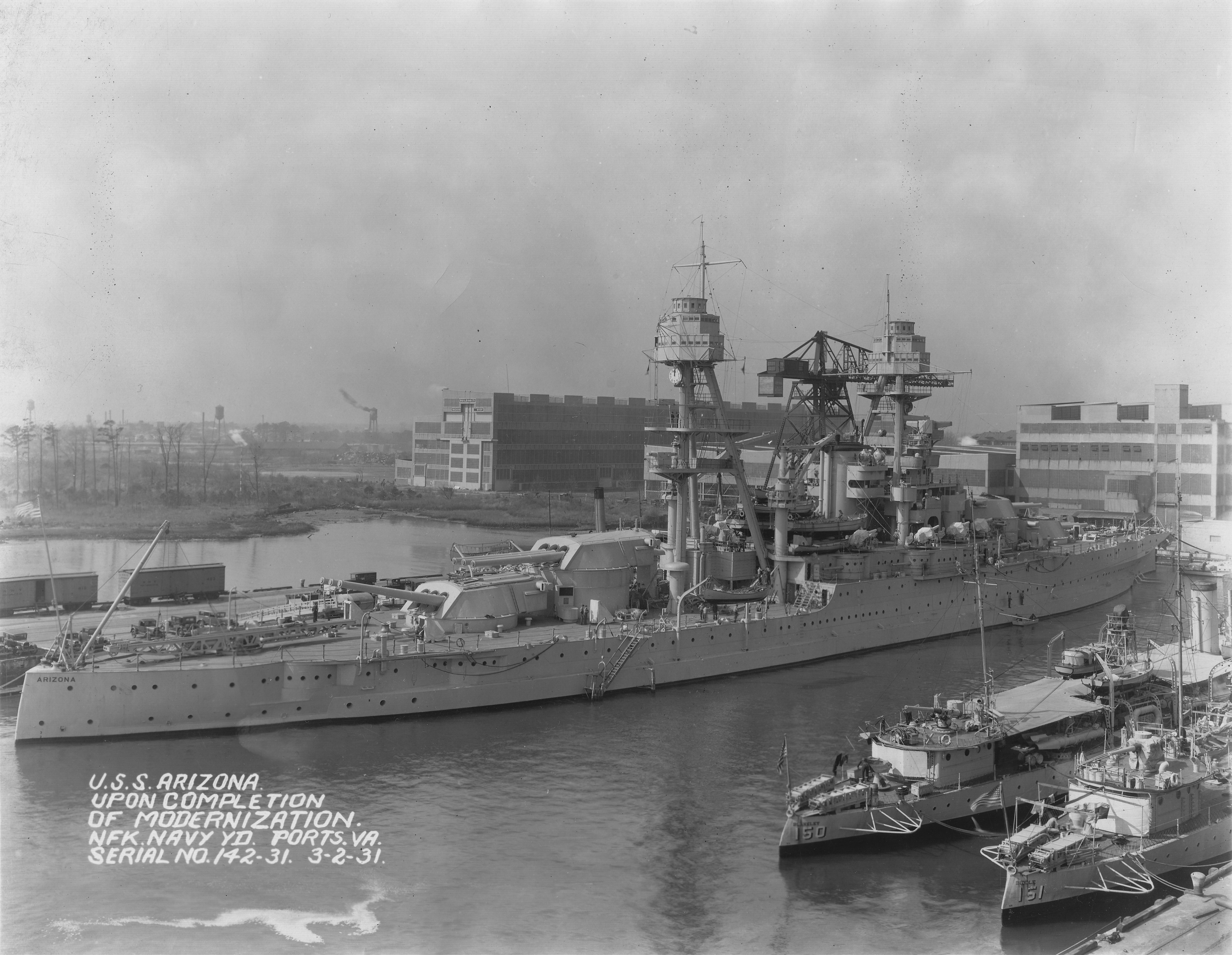
USS Arizona's 1931 tripod mast refit

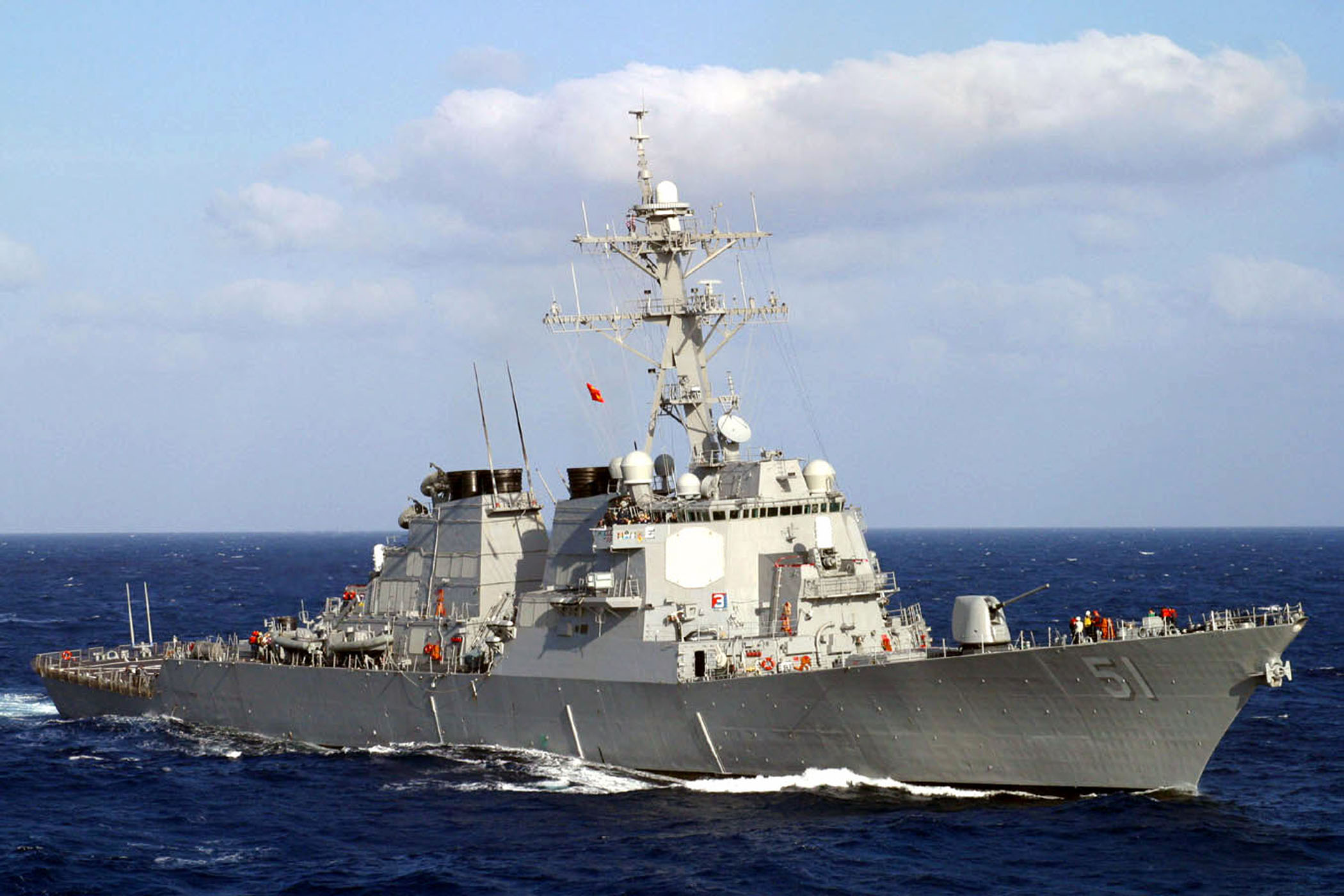
The Arleigh Burke-class destroyers have a modern form of tripod mast

== See also ==
- Pagoda mast
