= French ironclad Magenta (1890) =

Ironclad warship of the French Navy

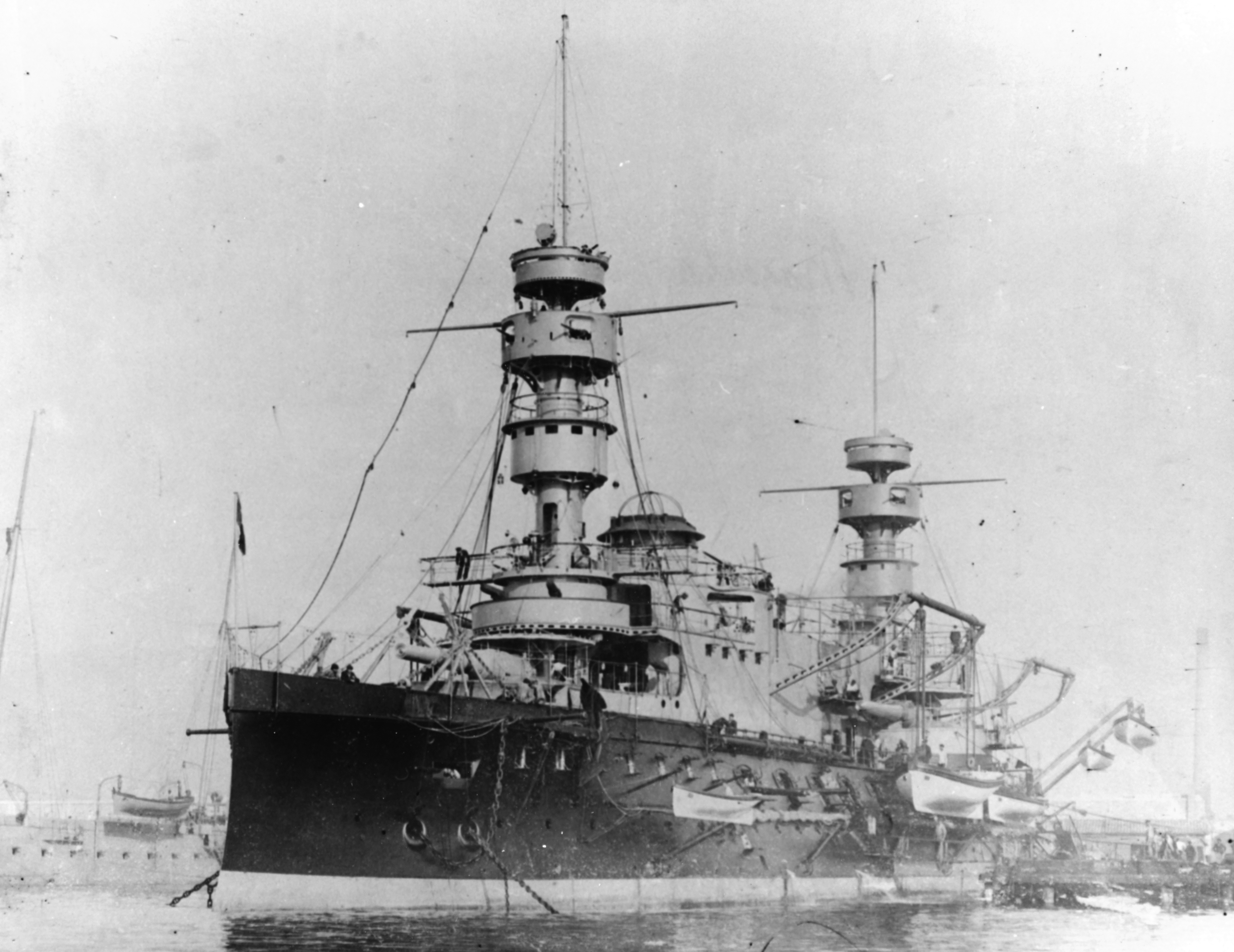
- Magenta early in her career

History

France
- Name: Magenta
- Builder: Toulon
- Laid down: 18 January 1883
- Launched: 19 April 1890
- Commissioned: 1 July 1892
- Decommissioned: 28 October 1907
- In service: 29 October 1893
- Stricken: 6 May 1909
- Fate: Sold, 1911

General characteristics
- Class & type: Marceau-class ironclad
- Displacement: 10,680 long tons (10,850 t)
- Length: 98.6 m (323 ft 6 in) lpp
- Beam: 20.06 to 20.19 m (66 to 66 ft)
- Draft: 8.23 to 8.43 m (27 ft 0 in to 27 ft 8 in)
- Installed power: 8 × fire tube boilers; 11,000 ihp (8,200 kW)
- Propulsion: 4 × compound steam engines; 2 × screw propellers
- Speed: 16 knots (30 km/h; 18 mph)
- Complement: 643–651
- Armament: 4 × 340mm/28 Modèle 1881 guns; 16 × 138mm/30 Modèle 1884 guns; 3–7 × 65 mm (2.6 in) Mle 1891 guns; 9–18 × 1 - 47/40 guns; 3–6 × 380 mm (15 in) torpedo tubes
- Armor: Belt: 229 to 457 mm (9 to 18 in); Deck: 80 mm (3.1 in); Conning tower: 120 to 150 mm (4.7 to 6 in); Barbettes: 406 mm (16 in); Gun shields: 64 mm (2.5 in)

Magenta was an ironclad barbette ship of the French Navy built in the 1880s and early 1890s. She was the third and final member of the Marceau class. The Marceau class was based on the earlier Amiral Baudin class of barbette ships, but with smaller guns: four 340 mm (13.4 in) weapons compared to the three 420 mm (16.5 in) guns of the earlier vessels. The ships introduced the lozenge arrangement for their main battery that became common for many French capital ships built in the 1890s. Magenta and her sister ships suffered from a number of problems, including poor stability, insufficient armor protection, and excessive displacement.

Magenta, completed in 1893, had a relatively short and uneventful career, which she spent in the Mediterranean Squadron conducting training exercises. New pre-dreadnought battleships began to enter service in the mid-1890s, which displaced the Marceaus to the Reserve Division, where they were used as training ships. Magenta and her sisters were scheduled to be modernized with new water-tube boilers in the early 1900s, but by the time the new boilers were delivered, ironclads like the Marceaus were obsolete, and so no work was carried out. She thereafter returned to training duties before being struck from the naval register in 1909. She was sold to ship breakers in 1911.

== Design ==
The Marceau class of ironclad barbette ships was initially intended to be similar to the Amiral Baudin class, but by the time work on the design was being completed in 1880, the very large guns used in the earlier vessels had fallen out of favor in the French Navy. Lighter guns allowed a fourth weapon to be added to the main battery, which were rearranged into a lozenge layout that would be used in most French capital ships built over the following ten years. The class was to have comprised four vessels, but the first unit, Hoche had to be redesigned with a reduced armament after construction began after it became apparent that the initial design was not feasible on the specified dimensions. Work on the remaining three vessels had not yet begun, so their design could be enlarged to accommodate the intended armament. The design of the Marceau-class ships was revised repeatedly during construction, and by the time they were completed, they were seriously overweight, which submerged much of their belt armor and degraded their stability. These problems were common for French capital ships of the period.

=== Characteristics ===
Profile and top views of the Marceau class, c. 1908

Magenta was 98.6 m (323 ft 6 in) long between perpendiculars, with a beam of 20.06 to 20.19 m (66 to 66 ft) and a draft of 8.23 to 8.43 m (27 ft 0 in to 27 ft 8 in). She displaced 10,680 long tons (10,850 t). She was fitted with a pair of pole masts equipped with fighting tops that carried some of her light guns and spotted for her main battery. The crew included 643–651 officers and enlisted men. Her propulsion machinery consisted of four compound steam engines that drove a pair of screw propellers. Steam was provided by eight coal-burning fire-tube boilers. Her engines were rated to produce 11,000 indicated horsepower (8,200 kW) for a top speed of 16 knots (30 km/h; 18 mph).

Her main armament consisted of four 340 mm (13.4 in) Modèle 1881, 28-caliber guns mounted in individual barbette mounts, one forward and one aft, both on the centerline, and two amidships in wing mounts. These guns were supported by a secondary battery of sixteen 138 mm (5.4 in) guns, all carried in individual pivot mounts in an unarmored gun battery in the hull, eight guns per broadside. For defense against torpedo boats, she carried an extensive battery of light guns, though the numbers vary between sources. Gardiner reports a range of three to six 65 mm (2.6 in) 65 mm (2.6 in) guns, nine to eighteen 47 mm (1.9 in) 3-pounder guns, eight to twelve 37 mm (1.5 in) 1-pounder five-barrel Hotchkiss revolving cannon, and three to five 450 mm (18 in) torpedo tubes in deck-mounted launchers; naval historian Eric Gille gives four to seven 65 mm guns, nine to twelve 47 mm guns, and eight 37 mm guns; naval historian Paul Silverstone says six 65 mm guns and twelve 47 mm guns. There is similar disagreement over the torpedo armament, with Gardiner providing three to five 380 mm (15 in) torpedo tubes, Gille reporting five to six tubes, and Silverstone stating five tubes.

The ship was protected with a combination of mild steel and compound armor; her belt was 229 to 457 mm (9 to 18 in) thick and extended for the entire length of the hull. Horizontal protection consisted of an armor deck that was 80 mm (3.1 in) thick. The barbettes for the main battery were 406 mm (16 in) thick and the supporting tubes that connected them to their magazines were 203 to 229 mm (8 to 9 in). The guns themselves were protected by 64 mm (2.5 in) gun shields. Her conning tower was 120 to 150 mm (4.7 to 6 in) thick.

== Service history ==
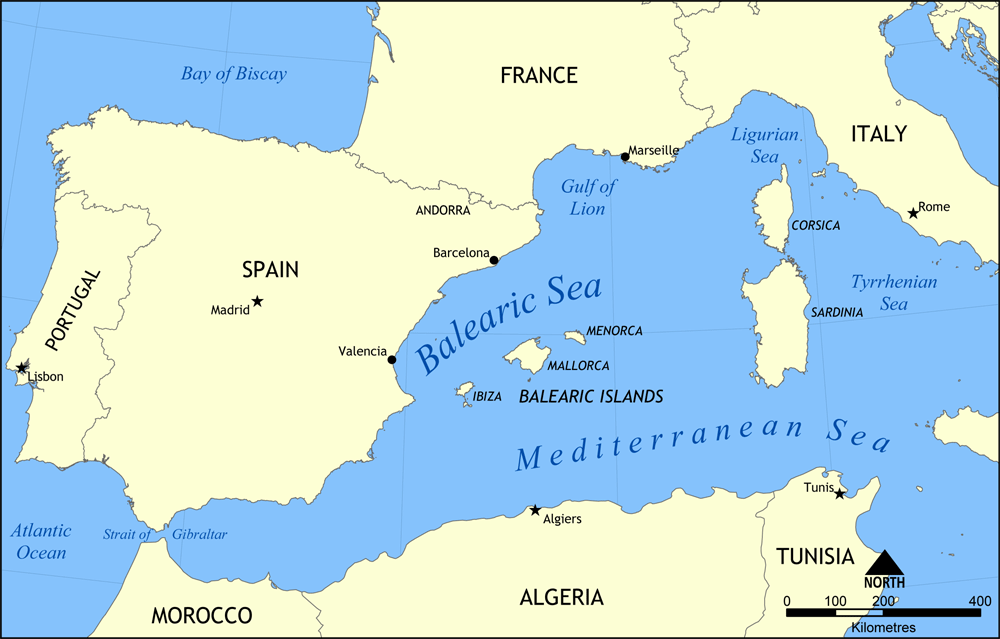
Map of the western Mediterranean, where Magenta spent the majority of her peacetime career

Magenta was ordered in September 1880, and was laid down on 18 January 1883 at Toulon. She was launched on 19 April 1890 and installation of her propulsion system was completed by 5 June 1892. Magenta was commissioned on 1 July to begin sea trials. She was not fully manned until 1 January 1893, and she first went to sea in April. Her official acceptance trials were carried out between June and September. By the time she was completed, her original design had been radically altered with a very large superstructure that greatly reduced her stability. With her main battery guns trained to one side during a turn, she heeled up to twelve degrees. Stability problems were worse for Magenta than either of her sisters. She was assigned to the Mediterranean Squadron, and she got underway on 20 November to join the unit. While she was part of the squadron, she was only active for nine months of the year. The unit at that time also included her two sister ships and the ironclads Amiral Baudin, Formidable, Amiral Duperré, Courbet, Hoche, and Dévastation.

During the 1895 maneuvers, which began on 1 July, Magenta and the rest of the Mediterranean Squadron conducted a training cruise and practice shooting while the Reserve Squadron mobilized its ships. The main period of exercises saw the fleet divided into three units and Magenta was assigned to the third unit, tasked with defending Ajaccio from the other two fleets. The maneuvers concluded on 27 July. The following year, the Mediterranean Squadron consisted of Magenta, her two sisters, the two Amiral Baudin-class ships, Courbet, Dévastation, the ironclad Redoutable and the new pre-dreadnought battleship Brennus. That year, Magenta served as the flagship of Rear Admiral E. T. MacGuckin de Slane, who commanded the 3rd Division of the squadron. She participated in the fleet maneuvers that lasted from 17 to 30 July, during which Magenta served as part of the simulated enemy fleet.

By 1897, additional pre-dreadnoughts began to enter service, including Charles Martel and Jauréguiberry. They joined Magenta and the other Marceaus, Brennus, Amiral Baudin, and Redoutable in the Mediterranean Squadron. Magenta was reduced to reserve in 1898 as additional pre-dreadnoughts joined the fleet. During the fleet maneuvers that year, the submarine Gustave Zédé "torpedoed" Magenta twice, once while she was at anchor and a second time while underway. The French fleet was reorganized in 1899, and the three Marceau-class ships were organized as a separate division attached to the Mediterranean Squadron for torpedo and gunnery training purposes. The unit was commanded by Rear Admiral Gabriel Godin. In the 1890s, the French Navy began rebuilding older ironclads to prolong their useful lives, and modernizations for the three Marceaus were authorized that year. Magenta and her two sisters were assigned to the 1899 fleet maneuvers, which lasted from 5 to 25 July.

Magenta relieved Marceau as a training ship for torpedo boat crews on 1 June 1900. She remained formally assigned to the Reserve Division into 1901, though she lay in Toulon and did not operate with the rest of the unit. By that time, her boilers were in poor condition, and new Belleville boilers were ordered to replace them on 14 August; in the meantime, her existing boilers were re-tubed to allow her to continue operating as a training vessel. By 1903, Marceau had joined her as a training ship; both ships were based in Toulon. The Belleville boilers were delivered in 1907, but by that time, the navy had no intention of completing the overhaul; her sister Neptune had had her re-boilering cancelled two years earlier. Magenta was decommissioned on 28 October 1907 she was struck from the naval register on 6 May 1909. She was thereafter used as a barracks ship in Toulon, replacing the old ironclad Colbert. She was listed for sale 1 August 1911 and was later sold to be broken up.
