= French ironclad Neptune =

Ironclad warship of the French Navy

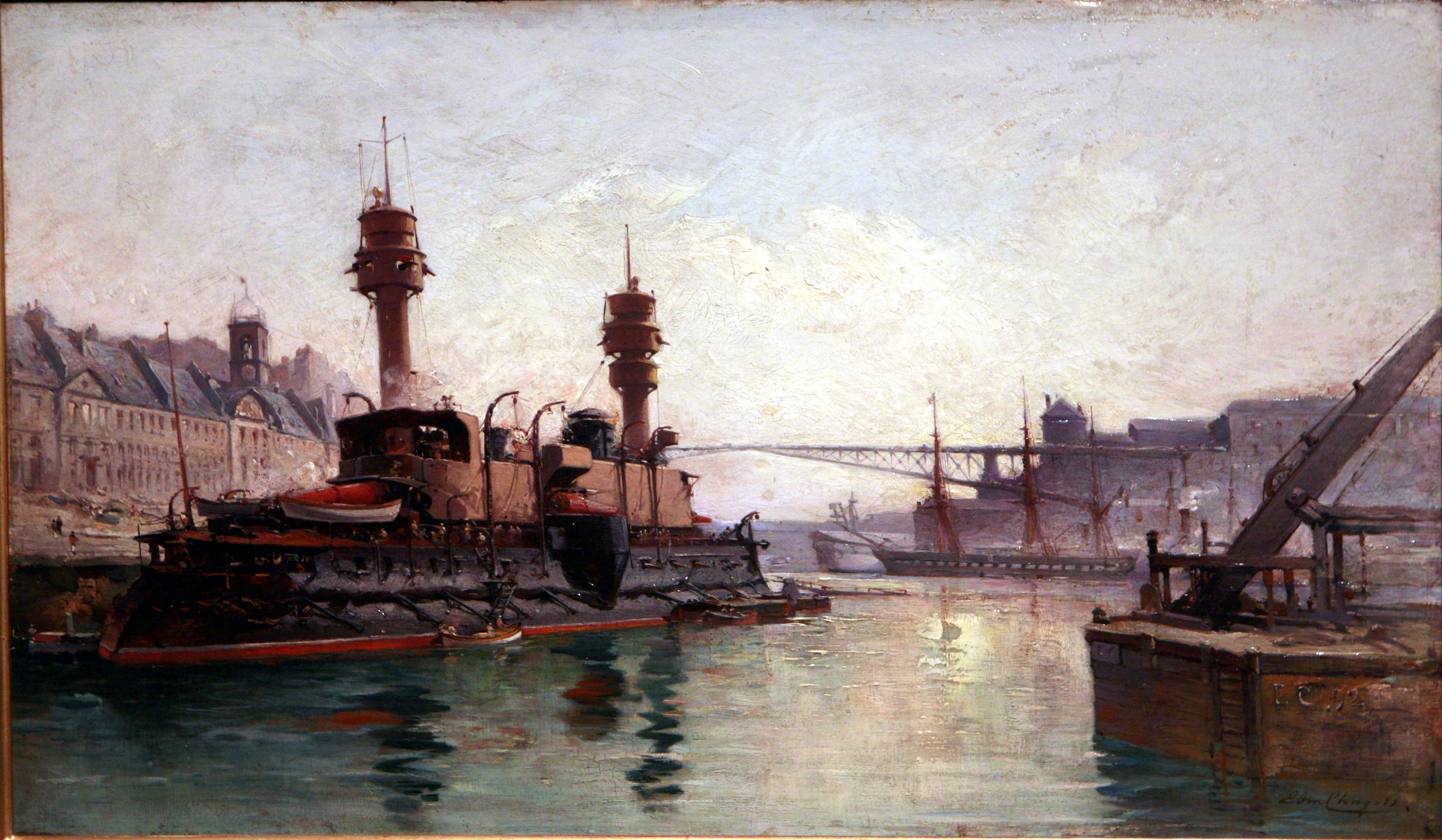
- Neptune on Penfeld river, c. 1892, by Edmond Chagot

History

France
- Name: Neptune
- Namesake: Neptune
- Ordered: 7 October 1880
- Builder: Arsenal de Brest
- Laid down: 17 April 1882
- Launched: 7 May 1887
- Commissioned: 15 May 1891
- In service: 1 December 1892
- Stricken: 4 February 1908
- Fate: Broken up, 1913

General characteristics
- Class & type: Marceau-class ironclad
- Displacement: 10,810 long tons (10,980 t)
- Length: 98.6 m (323 ft 6 in) lpp
- Beam: 20.06 to 20.19 m (66 to 66 ft)
- Draft: 8.23 to 8.43 m (27 ft 0 in to 27 ft 8 in)
- Installed power: 12 × fire tube boilers; 11,000 ihp (8,200 kW)
- Propulsion: 4 × compound steam engines; 2 × screw propellers
- Speed: 16 knots (30 km/h; 18 mph)
- Complement: 643–651
- Armament: 4 × 340mm/28 Modèle 1881 guns; 16 × 138mm/30 Modèle 1884 guns; 3–7 × 65 mm (2.6 in) Mle 1891 guns; 9–18 × 47/40 guns; 8–12 × 37 mm (1.5 in) Hotchkiss revolver cannon; 3–6 × 380 mm (15 in) torpedo tubes
- Armor: Belt: 229 to 457 mm (9 to 18 in); Deck: 80 mm (3.1 in); Conning tower: 120 to 150 mm (4.7 to 6 in); Barbettes: 406 mm (16 in); Gun shields: 64 mm (2.5 in)

Neptune was an ironclad barbette ship of the French Navy built in the 1880s and early 1890s. She was the second member of the Marceau class, which included two other vessels. The Marceau class was based on the earlier Amiral Baudin class of barbette ships, but with smaller guns: four 340 mm (13.4 in) weapons compared to the three 420 mm (16.5 in) guns of the earlier vessels. They introduced the lozenge arrangement for their main battery that became common for many French capital ships built in the 1890s. Neptune and her sister ships suffered from a number of problems, including poor stability, insufficient armor protection, and excessive displacement.

Neptune, completed in 1892, had a relatively short and uneventful career, which she spent in the Mediterranean Squadron conducting training exercises. New pre-dreadnought battleships began to enter service in the mid-1890s, which displaced the Marceaus to the Reserve Division, where they were used as training ships. Neptune and her sisters were scheduled to be modernized with new water-tube boilers in the early 1900s, but by the time the new boilers were delivered, ironclads like the Marceaus were obsolete, and so no work was carried out. She saw no further active service, was struck from the naval register in 1908, and she was used as a target ship from then until 1912. Sunk in weapons tests in 1912, she was raised in 1913 and sold to ship breakers and dismantled.

== Design ==
The Marceau class of ironclad barbette ships was initially intended to be similar to the Amiral Baudin class, but by the time work on the design was being completed in 1880, the very large guns used in the earlier vessels had fallen out of favor in the French Navy. Lighter guns allowed a fourth weapon to be added to the main battery, which were rearranged into a lozenge layout that would be used in most French capital ships built over the following ten years. The class was to have comprised four vessels, but the first unit, Hoche had to be redesigned with a reduced armament after construction began when it became apparent that the initial design was not feasible on the specified dimensions. Work on the remaining three vessels had not yet begun, so their design could be enlarged to accommodate the intended armament. The design of the Marceau-class ships was revised repeatedly during construction, and by the time they were completed, they were seriously overweight, which submerged much of their belt armor and degraded their stability. These problems were common for French capital ships of the period.

=== Characteristics ===
Profile and top views of the Marceau class, c. 1908

Neptune was 98.6 m (323 ft 6 in) long between perpendiculars, with a beam of 20.06 to 20.19 m (66 to 66 ft) and a draft of 8.23 to 8.43 m (27 ft 0 in to 27 ft 8 in). She displaced 10,810 long tons (10,980 t). She was fitted with a pair of pole masts equipped with fighting tops that carried some of her light guns and spotted for her main battery. The crew included 643–651 officers and enlisted men. Her propulsion machinery consisted of four compound steam engines that drove a pair of screw propellers. Steam was provided by twelve coal-burning fire-tube boilers. Her engines were rated to produce 11,000 indicated horsepower (8,200 kW) for a top speed of 16 knots (30 km/h; 18 mph).

Her main armament consisted of four improved 340 mm (13.4 in) Modèle 1881 (v. 1884), 28-caliber (cal.) guns mounted in individual barbette mounts, one forward and one aft, both on the centerline, and two amidships in wing mounts. These guns were supported by a secondary battery of sixteen 138 mm (5.4 in) 30-cal. guns, all carried in individual pivot mounts in an unarmored gun battery in the hull, eight guns per broadside. For defense against torpedo boats, she carried an extensive battery of light guns, though the numbers vary between sources. Gardiner reports a range of three to six 65 mm (2.6 in) guns, nine to eighteen 47 mm (1.9 in) 3-pounder guns, eight to twelve 37 mm (1.5 in) 1-pounder five-barrel Hotchkiss revolving cannon; naval historian Eric Gille gives four to seven 65 mm guns, nine to twelve 47 mm guns, and eight 37 mm guns; naval historian Paul Silverstone says six 65 mm guns and twelve 47 mm guns. There is similar disagreement over the torpedo armament, with Gardiner providing three to five 380 mm (15 in) torpedo tubes, Gille reporting five to six tubes, and Silverstone stating five tubes.

The ship was protected with a combination of mild steel and compound armor; her belt was 229 to 457 mm (9 to 18 in) thick and extended for the entire length of the hull. Horizontal protection consisted of an armor deck that was 80 mm (3.1 in) thick. The barbettes for the main battery were 406 mm (16 in) thick and the supporting tubes that connected them to their magazines were 203 to 229 mm (8 to 9 in). The guns themselves were protected by 64 mm (2.5 in) thick gun shields. Her conning tower was 120 to 150 mm (4.7 to 6 in) thick.

== Service history ==
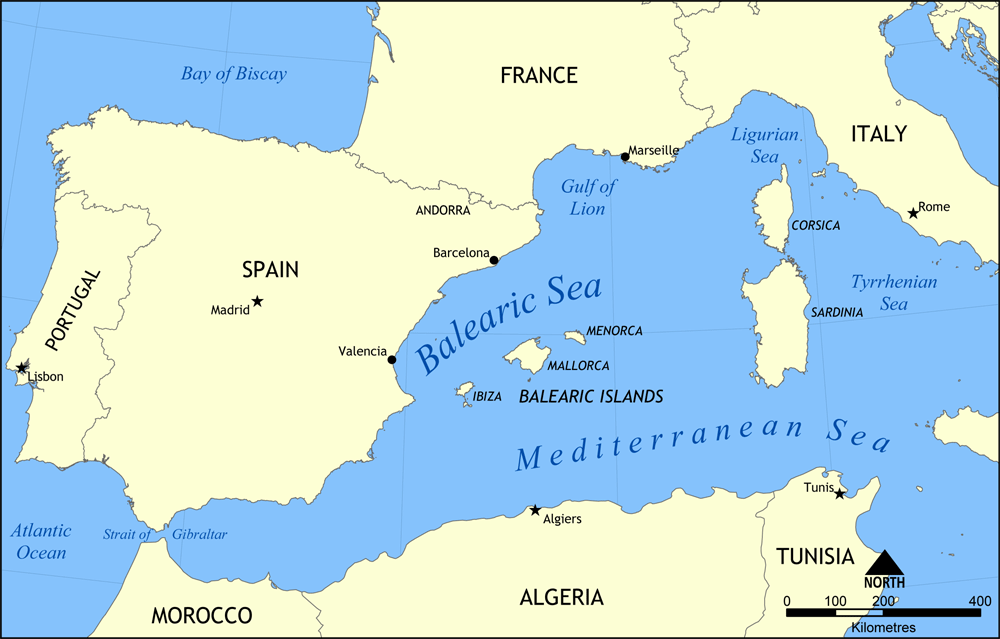
Map of the western Mediterranean, where Neptune spent the majority of her peacetime career

The contract for Neptune was authorized on 7 October 1880, though work on the ship did not begin until her keel laying on 17 April 1882 at the Arsenal de Brest. She was launched on 7 May 1887 and was commissioned to begin sea trials on 15 May 1891. She was not fully manned for testing until 21 September, and her trials lasted until 1 December 1892, when she was placed in full commission. Neptune sailed from Brest on 26 December, bound for Toulon on France's Mediterranean coast. When she arrived there on 9 January 1893, she joined the Mediterranean Squadron. At that time, the unit also included both of her sister ships and the ironclads Amiral Baudin, Formidable, Amiral Duperré, Courbet, Hoche, and Dévastation. She participated in the fleet maneuvers that year as part of the 3rd Division, in company with her sister Marceau and Dévastation, the latter serving as the divisional flagship. The maneuvers included an initial period of exercises from 1 to 10 July and then larger-scale maneuvers from 17 to 28 July.

During the 1895 maneuvers, which began on 1 July, Neptune and the rest of the Mediterranean Squadron conducted a training cruise and practice shooting while the Reserve Squadron mobilized its ships. The main period of exercises saw the fleet divided into three units and Neptune was assigned to the second unit, tasked with operating with the first unit to attack the defending third fleet in Ajaccio. The maneuvers concluded on 27 July. The following year, the Mediterranean Squadron consisted of Neptune, her two sisters, the two Amiral Baudin-class ships, Courbet, Dévastation, the ironclad Redoutable and the new pre-dreadnought battleship Brennus. That year, she served in the 3rd Division of the squadron. She participated in the fleet maneuvers that lasted from 17 to 30 July, during which Neptune served as part of the simulated enemy fleet.

By 1897, additional pre-dreadnoughts began to enter service, including Charles Martel and Jauréguiberry. They joined Neptune and the other Marceaus, Brennus, Amiral Baudin, and Redoutable in the Mediterranean Squadron. During the 1897 fleet gunnery trials, which saw the first use of a new system of centralized fire control in the French fleet, 'Neptune, Marceau, and Brennus all achieved more than 25 percent hits at ranges of between 3,000 yd (2,700 m) and 4,000 yd (3,700 m). She remained in service with the Mediterranean Squadron in 1898. The French fleet was reorganized in 1899, and the three Marceau-class ships were organized as a separate division attached to the Mediterranean Squadron for torpedo and gunnery training purposes. The unit was commanded by Rear Admiral Gabriel Godin. In the 1890s, the French began rebuilding older ironclads to prolong their useful lives, and modernizations for the three Marceaus were authorized that year. Neptune and her two sisters were assigned to the 1899 fleet maneuvers, which lasted from 5 to 25 July. Later that year, Neptune was sent to Brest, where she was placed in the 2nd category of reserve.

By 1900, the ship's boilers were in such bad condition that Neptune could no longer be operated. She was nominally assigned to the Reserve Division of the Mediterranean Squadron. She was decommissioned in November 1901, to await the delivery of new Belleville boilers that had been ordered in 1898. Some limited modifications were carried out in 1902, including cutting down her heavy military masts in favor of lighter pole masts. Neptune was moved to Cherbourg on 5 July 1905 to finally have her new boilers installed, but the shipyard there informed the navy that any funds spent renovating the ship would be a waste, given the age of the ship. The navy cancelled the planned refit and Neptune was again decommissioned on 1 June 1907. Neptune saw no further service, and during a debate over naval expenditures in 1908, the senator Alcide Poirrier expressed opposition to further such reconstructions and pointed out the waste of funds that the work on Neptune and several other vessels represented. Neptune was struck from the naval register on 4 February 1908 and was thereafter used as a target ship at Cherbourg through 1912. In November and December that year, she was used in tests with shells fitted with experimental warheads that were filled with Planclastite, a combination of nitrogen peroxide and carbon bisulfide. One of the tests sank the ship in shallow water, and she was re-floated on 4 April 1913. She was towed back to port and placed for sale on 11 July, and was sold on 20 October to be broken up.
