= French ship Marceau =

At least two ships of the French Navy have borne the name Marceau:

- French ironclad Marceau, lead ship of the Marceau-class ironclad launched in 1887 and wrecked in 1922
- French destroyer Marceau (D601), a Type 1936A (Mob) destroyer launched in 1941 as the German destroyer Z31, acquired by France in 1946 and renamed. She was stricken in 1958.
