= French ironclad Marceau =

Ironclad warship of the French Navy

- Marceau early in her career

History

France
- Name: Marceau
- Namesake: General François Séverin Marceau-Desgraviers
- Ordered: October 1880
- Builder: Forges et Chantiers de la Méditerranée, La Seyne-sur-Mer
- Laid down: 28 November 1882
- Launched: 24 May 1887
- Commissioned: 27 January 1890
- In service: 14 March 1891
- Stricken: 1 October 1920
- Fate: Wrecked, 17 January 1922

General characteristics
- Class & type: Marceau-class ironclad
- Displacement: 10,558 long tons (10,727 t)
- Length: 103.62 m (340 ft 0 in) loa
- Beam: 20.23 m (66 ft 4 in)
- Draft: 8.13 m (26 ft 8 in)
- Installed power: 8 × fire tube boilers; 12,030 ihp (8,970 kW)
- Propulsion: 2 × compound steam engines; 2 × screw propellers
- Speed: 16.19 knots (29.98 km/h; 18.63 mph)
- Range: 2,900 nmi (5,400 km; 3,300 mi) at 10 knots (19 km/h; 12 mph)
- Complement: 647
- Armament: 4 × 340 mm (13 in) guns; 17 × 138.6 mm (5.46 in) guns; 4 × 65 mm (2.6 in) M1888 guns; 12 × 1 - 47 mm (1.9 in) M1885 guns; 8 × 37 mm (1.5 in) Hotchkiss revolver cannon; 6 × 356 mm (14 in) torpedo tubes
- Armor: Belt: 229 to 457 mm (9 to 18 in); Deck: 80 mm (3.1 in); Conning tower: 120 to 150 mm (4.7 to 6 in); Barbettes: 406 mm (16 in); Gun shields: 64 mm (2.5 in)

Marceau was an ironclad barbette ship built for the French Navy during the 1880s, the lead ship of her class. She served in the Mediterranean Squadron until 1900, when she was rebuilt and subsequently placed in reserve. She returned to service in 1906 as a torpedo training ship. During World War I, she served in Malta and Corfu as a submarine tender. The old ironclad was sold for scrapping in 1920, and while being towed to Toulon, she ran aground in a gale off Bizerte and became stranded. The wreck remained visible there until the 1930s.

== Design ==
The Marceau class of ironclad barbette ships was initially intended to be similar to the Amiral Baudin class, but by the time work on the design was being completed in 1880, the very large guns used in the earlier vessels had fallen out of favor in the French Navy. Lighter guns allowed a fourth weapon to be added to the main battery, which were rearranged into a lozenge layout that would be used in most French capital ships built over the following ten years. The class was to have comprised four vessels, but the first unit, Hoche had to be redesigned with a reduced armament after construction began after it became apparent that the initial design was not feasible on the specified dimensions. Work on the remaining three vessels had not yet begun, so their design could be enlarged to accommodate the intended armament. The design of the Marceau-class ships was revised repeatedly during construction, and by the time they were completed, they were seriously overweight, which submerged much of their belt armor and degraded their stability. These problems were common for French capital ships of the period.

=== Characteristics ===
Plan and profile drawing of Marceau in 1908

Marceau was 103.62 m (340 ft) long overall, with a beam of 20.23 m (66 ft 4 in) and an average draft of 8.13 m (26 ft 8 in). She displaced 10,850 t (10,680 long tons; 11,960 short tons). As was common for French warships of the period, her hull featured a pronounced tumblehome shape and had a ram bow. She was fitted with a pair of light military masts equipped with fighting tops that carried some of her light guns and spotted for her main battery. The crew consisted of 647 officers and enlisted men.

Her propulsion machinery consisted of a pair of compound steam engines that each drove a screw propeller. Steam was provided by eight coal-burning fire-tube boilers that were vented through a single large funnel. Her engines were rated to produce 12,030 indicated horsepower (8,970 kW), but on her initial sea trials, she reached 11,168 ihp (8,328 kW) for a top speed of 16.2 knots (30.0 km/h; 18.6 mph). Coal storage amounted to 610 t (600 long tons; 670 short tons), which allowed Marceau to steam for 2,900 nautical miles (5,400 km; 3,300 mi) at a speed of 10 knots (19 km/h; 12 mph).

Her main armament consisted of four 340 mm (13.4 in) 28.5-caliber guns mounted in individual barbette mounts, one forward and one aft, both on the centerline, and two amidships in wing mounts. Two of the guns were the M1881 type and the other two were the updated M1884 variant. These guns were supported by a secondary battery of seventeen 138.6 mm (5.46 in) M1884 guns, all carried in individual pivot mounts in an unarmored gun battery in the hull, eight guns per broadside, and the last gun in a firing port in the bow. For defense against torpedo boats, she carried an extensive battery of light guns. These included four 65 mm (2.6 in) M1888 quick-firing guns (QF), twelve 47 mm (1.9 in) M1885 QF guns, and eight 37 mm (1.5 in) Hotchkiss revolver cannon. She also carried a single 47 mm revolver cannon that could be fitted to one of her pinnaces, and two 65 mm field guns that could be sent ashore with a landing party. (Note: Other sources report a range of guns: Campbell reports a range of three to six 65 mm (2.6 in) guns, nine to eighteen 47 mm (1.9 in) 3-pounder guns, eight to twelve 37 mm (1.5 in) 1-pounder five-barrel Hotchkiss revolving cannon; naval historian Eric Gille gives four to seven 65 mm guns, nine to twelve 47 mm guns, and eight 37 mm guns; naval historian Paul Silverstone says six 65 mm guns and twelve 47 mm guns.) In addition to her gun armament, she was equipped with six 356 mm (14 in) torpedo tubes, all above water; two were in the amidships battery deck forward, two on the armor deck amidships, and the last pair at the same level further aft. (Note: Similar confusion exists over the number of the torpedo tubes: Campbell states there were three to five 450 mm (18 in) torpedo tubes in deck-mounted launchers; Gille provides five to six tubes, while Silverstone lists five tubes.)

The ship was protected with a combination of mild steel and compound armor; her belt was 229 to 457 mm (9 to 18 in) thick and extended for the entire length of the hull. Horizontal protection consisted of an armor deck that was 80 mm (3.1 in) thick. The barbettes for the main battery were 406 mm (16 in) thick and the supporting tubes that connected them to their magazines were 203 to 229 mm (8 to 9 in). The guns themselves were protected by 64 mm (2.5 in) gun shields. Her conning tower was 120 to 150 mm (4.7 to 6 in) thick.

== Service history ==
=== Construction – 1896 ===
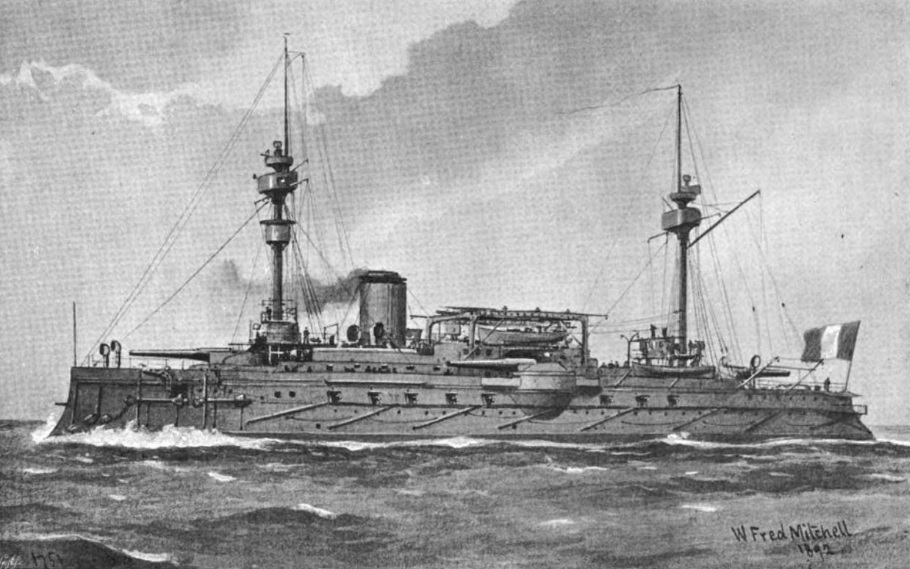
Illustration of Marceau as originally built

Marceau was ordered in October 1880 and her contract was awarded on 27 December 1880, but work did not begin assembling material until 27 January 1882. Her keel was not laid down until 28 November at the Société Nouvelle des Forges et Chantiers de la Méditerranée shipyard in La Seyne-sur-Mer. Work proceeded slowly, and she was not launched until 24 May 1887. This was a result of the influence of Admiral Théophile Aube, who was the Minister of Marine in 1886–1887; Aube was a staunch advocate of the so-called Jeune École and opposed new battleship construction. Fitting out work was completed much more quickly, however, and she was commissioned to begin sea trials on 27 January 1890. Her initial testing was delayed until September, and she was not fully manned until 17 January 1891. Her official acceptance trials were carried out in February and March, and she was placed into full commission on 14 March.

After her commissioning, she joined a French fleet that visited Kronstadt and was inspected by Czar Alexander III of Russia. On the return voyage, the fleet stopped in Spithead, where Queen Victoria reviewed the ships. This turned out to be the only time Marceau operated in the Atlantic; after returning to France, she was assigned to the Mediterranean Squadron, where she remained for the duration of her career. She was joined there by both of her sister ships in 1893; at that time, the unit also included the ironclads Amiral Baudin, Formidable, Amiral Duperré, Courbet, Hoche, and Dévastation. She participated in the fleet maneuvers that year as part of the 3rd Division, in company with her sister Neptune and Dévastation, the latter serving as the divisional flagship. The maneuvers included an initial period of exercises from 1 to 10 July and then larger-scale maneuvers from 17 to 28 July.

In 1895, Marceau, Courbet, Amiral Baudin, and Formidable all nearly ran aground off Hyères; Marceau and three tugs were used to tow Amiral Baudin back to port. During the 1895 maneuvers, which began on 1 July, Marceau and the rest of the Mediterranean Squadron conducted a training cruise and practice shooting while the Reserve Squadron mobilized its ships. The main period of exercises saw the fleet divided into three units and Marceau was assigned to the second unit, tasked with operating with the first unit to attack the defending third fleet in Ajaccio. The maneuvers concluded on 27 July. The following year, the Mediterranean Squadron consisted of Marceau, her two sisters, the two Amiral Baudin-class ships, Courbet, Dévastation, the ironclad Redoutable and the new pre-dreadnought battleship Brennus. That year, she served in the 1st Division of the squadron. She participated in the fleet maneuvers that lasted from 17 to 30 July, during which Marceau served as part of the French fleet that attempted to defeat simulated attacks on the French coast. From September to November, she served as the French station ship at Ottoman Crete, which was then in a period of significant unrest. In November, she was replaced by the torpedo cruiser Wattignies.

=== 1897–1921 ===
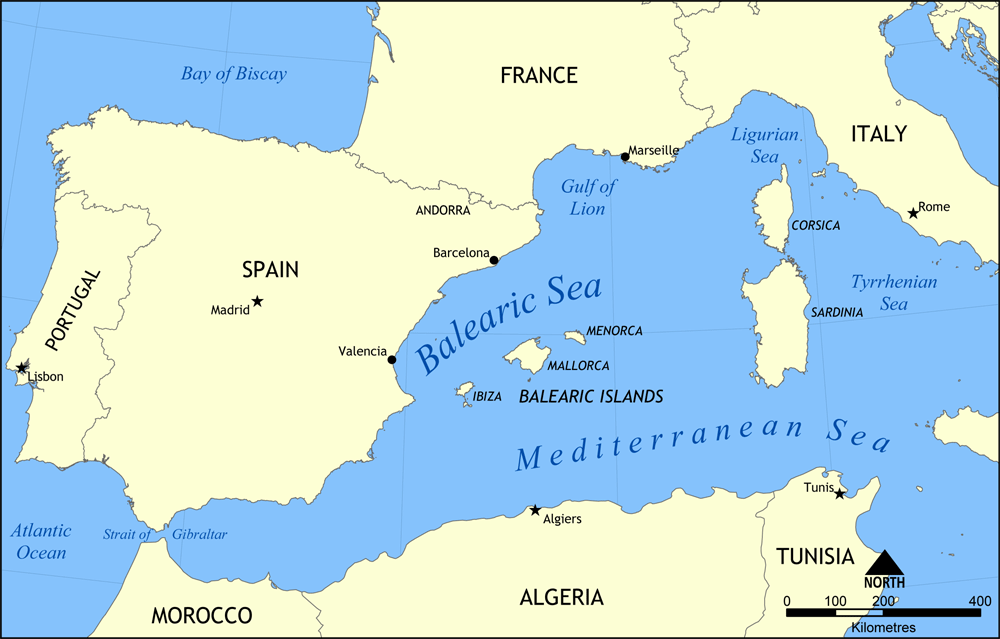
Map of the western Mediterranean, where Marceau spent the majority of her career

By 1897, additional pre-dreadnoughts began to enter service, including Charles Martel and Jauréguiberry. They joined the three Marceau, Brennus, Amiral Baudin, and Redoutable in the Mediterranean Squadron. During the 1897 fleet gunnery trials, which saw the first use of a new system of centralized fire control in the French fleet, Marceau, Neptune, and Brennus all achieved more than 25 percent hits at ranges of between 3,000 yd (2,700 m) and 4,000 yd (3,700 m). In 1898, Marceau and her sisters were assigned to a new training division that was attached to the Mediterranean fleet. The unit continued into 1899, but later that year, Marceau was transferred to the torpedo school. The unit was commanded by Rear Admiral Gabriel Godin. Marceau and her two sisters were assigned to the 1899 fleet maneuvers, which lasted from 5 to 25 July; during the exercises, Marceau was sent to the port of Bonifacio, Corsica, to demonstrate the suitability of the harbor for a squadron of ironclads. In 1900, the ship was replaced in the torpedo school by Magenta.

In the 1890s, the French began rebuilding older ironclads to prolong their useful lives, and reconstructions for the three Marceaus were authorized in early 1900. Marceau remained nominally assigned to the Reserve Division in early 1900, but she lay at Toulon and did not see activity with the rest of the unit. On 30 August 1900, Marceau returned to La Seyne for a major reconstruction. Her heavy military masts were cut down, her engines were modernized, and her boilers were replaced with sixteen Niclausse boilers. Another 138.6 mm gun was installed in the bow under the forecastle. The work was completed in May 1902, and Marceau underwent a series of sea trials for the remainder of the year. She did not return to active service with the fleet, however, and was thereafter used as a training ship based in Toulon. In 1906, she was converted into a training ship for torpedo operators in Toulon. She served in that capacity from 1907 to 1910, then as a training vessel for electricians from 1911 to 1912. She reverted to training torpedo crews from 1912 to 1914.

After the outbreak of World War I in August 1914, Marceau was converted into a floating workshop to support torpedo boats and submarines. She was initially based in Malta, but was later moved to Corfu and then to Brindisi in January 1918; at the last of the three locations, she served as the command ship for the 1st Submarine Squadron. After the war, in December, she was sent to Bizerte, where she was condemned on 5 July 1919. She was stricken from the naval register on 1 October 1920, and sold to the ship breaking firm M. Saglia based in Toulon on 30 September 1921. She left Bizerte on 17 January 1922, and while she was being towed to Toulon, a storm caused her to run aground off Bizerte. She remained visible there until the 1930s, and she was slowing dismantled in situ.
