= French destroyer Framée =

Destroyer of the French Navy

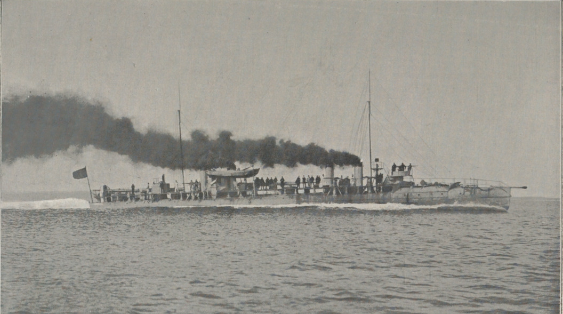
- Framée

History

France
- Name: Framée
- Namesake: Spear
- Ordered: 27 October 1897
- Builder: Ateliers et Chantiers de la Loire, Saint-Nazaire
- Laid down: 1897
- Launched: 29 June 1899
- Completed: June 1900
- Stricken: 26 October 1900
- Fate: Sunk in collision, 11 August 1900

General characteristics
- Class & type: Framée-class destroyer
- Displacement: 319 t (314 long tons)
- Length: 58.2 m (190 ft 11 in) o/a
- Beam: 6.31 m (20 ft 8 in)
- Draft: 3.02 m (9 ft 11 in)
- Installed power: 4 Normand boilers; 5,200 ihp (3,878 kW)
- Propulsion: 2 shafts; 2 triple-expansion steam engines
- Speed: 26 knots (48 km/h; 30 mph)
- Range: 1,541 nmi (2,854 km; 1,773 mi) at 14 knots (26 km/h; 16 mph)
- Complement: 4 officers, 57 enlisted men
- Armament: 1 × single 65 mm (2.6 in) gun; 6 × single 47 mm (1.9 in) guns; 2 × single 381 mm (15 in) torpedo tubes

Framée was the name ship of her class of four destroyers built for the French Navy around the beginning of the 20th century. Completed in mid-1900, she was sunk in a collision with the predreadnought battleship Brennus two months later with the loss of 47 men.

== Design and description ==
The Framées used the same hull design as the preceding Durandal class, but had a more powerful propulsion plant. The ships had an overall length of 58.2 meters (190 ft 11 in), a beam of 6.31 meters (20 ft 8 in), and a maximum draft of 3.02 meters (9 ft 11 in). They displaced 319 metric tons (314 long tons) at normal load. They were powered by a pair of triple-expansion steam engines, each driving one propeller shaft using steam provided by four Normand boilers. The engines were designed to produce a total of 5,200 indicated horsepower (3,878 kW) to give the ships a speed of 26 knots (48 km/h; 30 mph). During her sea trials in early 1900, Framée reached a speed of 26.9 knots (49.8 km/h; 31.0 mph). The ships carried enough coal to give them a range of 1,541 nautical miles (2,854 km; 1,773 mi) at 14 knots (26 km/h; 16 mph). Their complement consisted of 4 officers and 57 enlisted men.

The Framée-class ships were armed with a single 65-millimeter (2.6 in) gun forward of the bridge and six 47-millimeter (1.9 in) Hotchkiss guns, three on each broadside. They were fitted with two single rotating 381-millimeter (15 in) torpedo tubes, one between the funnels and the other on the stern.

== Construction and career ==
Framée (Spear) was ordered from Ateliers et Chantiers de la Loire on 27 October 1897 and the ship was laid down later that year at its shipyard in Nantes as the name ship of her class. She was launched on 29 June 1899 and arrived at Lorient on 25 January 1900 for fitting out and to conduct her sea trials that lasted through June. Although Framée was assigned to the Mediterranean Squadron (Escadre de la Méditerranée) on 29 June, she was temporarily assigned to the Northern Squadron (Escadre du Nord) while awaiting her sailing orders. On the night of 10/11 August 1900, while returning from exercises in the English Channel, she collided with Brennus off Cape St. Vincent. Framée sank quickly, with 47 of her crew of 61 killed. The ship was struck from the navy list on 26 October.

== Bibliography ==
- Campbell, N. J. M. (1979). "France". In Chesneau, Roger & Kolesnik, Eugene M. (eds.). Conway's All the World's Fighting Ships 1860–1905. Greenwich: Conway Maritime Press. pp. 283–333. ISBN 0-8317-0302-4.
- Johnson, Alfred S., ed. (1900). "Disasters". The Cyclopedic Review of Current History. 10. Boston, Massachusetts, USA: Current History Company: 682–683.
- Jordan, John & Caresse, Philippe (2017). French Battleships of World War One. Annapolis, Maryland: Naval Institute Press. ISBN 978-1-59114-639-1.
- Leyland, John (1901). "The Progress of Foreign Navies". In Leyland, John (ed.). The Naval Annual, 1901. Portsmouth, UK: J. Griffin and Co. pp. 33–70.
- Roberts, Stephen S. (2021). French Warships in the Age of Steam 1859–1914: Design, Construction, Careers and Fates. Barnsley, UK: Seaforth Publishing. ISBN 978-1-5267-4533-0.
