= Marceau-class ironclad =

Ironclad warship class of the French Navy

- Marceau early in her career

Class overview
- Name: Marceau class
- Builders: Arsenal de Brest; Arsenal de Lorient; Forges et Chantiers de la Méditerranée
- Operators: French Navy
- Preceded by: Hoche
- Succeeded by: Charles Martel class (planned); Brennus (actual)
- Built: 1882–1893
- In service: 1891–1920
- Completed: 3
- Lost: 1
- Retired: 2

General characteristics
- Type: Barbette ship
- Displacement: 10,558 to 10,810 long tons (10,727 to 10,983 t)
- Length: 98.6 m (323 ft 6 in) lpp
- Beam: 20.06 to 20.19 m (66 to 66 ft)
- Draft: 8.23 to 8.43 m (27 ft 0 in to 27 ft 8 in)
- Installed power: 8–12 × fire tube boilers; 11,000 ihp (8,200 kW)
- Propulsion: 2–4 × compound steam engines; 2 × screw propellers
- Speed: 16 knots (30 km/h; 18 mph)
- Complement: 643–651
- Armament: 4 × 340mm/28 Modèle 1881 guns; 16 × 138mm/30 Modèle 1884 guns; 3–7 × 65 mm (2.6 in) Mle 1891 guns; 9–18 × 47/40 guns; 3–6 × 380 mm (15 in) torpedo tubes
- Armor: Belt: 229 to 457 mm (9 to 18 in); Deck: 80 mm (3.1 in); Conning tower: 120 to 150 mm (4.7 to 6 in); Barbettes: 406 mm (16 in); Gun shields: 64 mm (2.5 in)

The Marceau class was group of three of ironclad barbette ships of the French Navy built in the 1880s and early 1890s. The class comprised Marceau, the lead ship, Neptune, and Magenta; a fourth member of the class, Hoche was substantially re-designed after defects in the original plans for the class could not be rectified. The ships were based on the earlier Amiral Baudin class of barbette ships, but with smaller guns: four 340 mm (13.4 in) weapons compared to the three 420 mm (16.5 in) guns of the earlier vessels. They introduced the lozenge arrangement for their main battery that became common for many French capital ships built in the 1890s. Continuous tinkering with the Marceau design during their long construction produced badly flawed vessels that were superseded by more powerful pre-dreadnought battleships almost immediately after the French commissioned them in the early 1890s.

The three ships served in the Mediterranean Squadron in the 1890s and saw little activity beyond routine training exercises. They were quickly reduced to the Reserve Division of the squadron as the French commissioned their own pre-dreadnoughts. All three Marceaus were modernized in the early 1900s, receiving new water-tube boilers and having their top-heavy superstructures and masts cut down, but they saw little activity afterward. Marceau and Magenta were used as training ships, while Neptune saw no further use. The latter two vessels were discarded between 1908 and 1913, while Marceau lingered on as a floating workshop. She was used in that role during World War I. She was sold to ship breakers in 1921, but was wrecked while being towed off Bizerte and could not be re-floated.

== Design ==
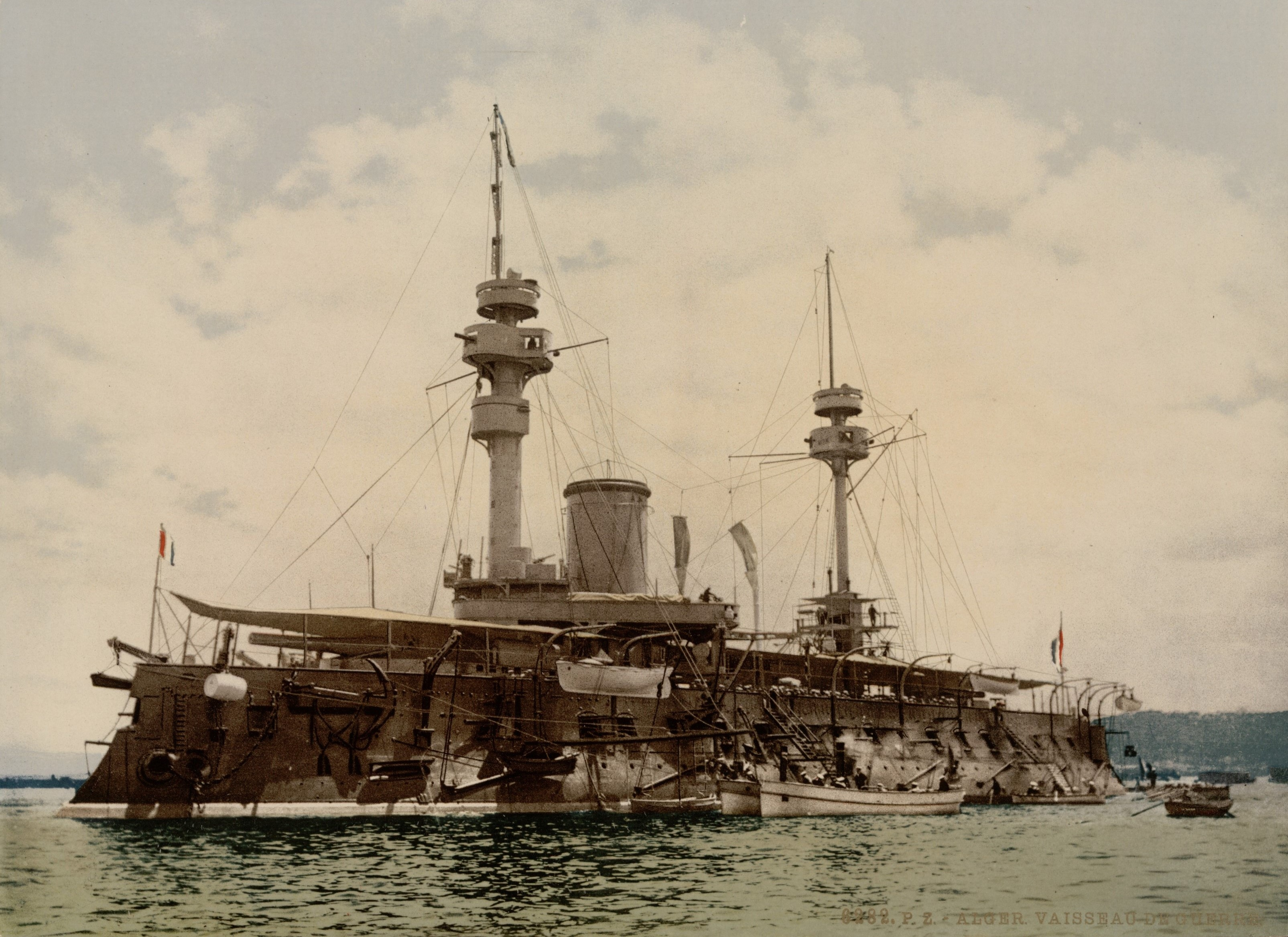
The Amiral Baudin-class ironclad Formidable; its very large 76-ton gun can be seen under the awning

In the aftermath of the Franco-Prussian War of 1870–1871, the French Navy embarked on a construction program to strengthen the fleet in 1872. By that time, the Italian Regia Marina (Royal Navy) had begun its own expansion program under the direction of Benedetto Brin, which included the construction of several very large ironclad warships of the Duilio and Italia classes, armed with 450 mm (17.7 in) 100-ton guns. The French initially viewed the ships as not worthy of concern, though by 1877, public pressure over the new Italian vessels prompted the Navy's Conseil des Travaux (Board of Construction) to design a response, beginning with the barbette ship Amiral Duperré and following with six vessels carrying 100-ton guns of French design. The first of these were the two Amiral Baudin-class ironclads, which carried their guns in open barbettes, all on the centerline, with one forward and two aft.

Problems aboard other vessels with new 76-ton guns prompted the naval command to abandon the as-yet untested 100-ton weapons. A modified version of the 76-ton gun with a longer barrel and that had been adapted to use new propellant charges was developed; these changes gave it higher muzzle velocity, which allowed its shells to penetrate as well as the 100-ton gun had been expected to perform. The Amiral Baudins were too advanced in their construction to allow their design to be revised, but the other four vessels of the program, which became Hoche and the three Marceau-class ironclads, had not yet begun building. Their design, which was prepared by the naval engineer Charles Ernest Huin, was radically altered from the Amiral Baudin arrangement to what would become the standard for future French capital ships for the next two decades. The large caliber guns were increased to four, one forward, one aft, and a wing mount on either side amidships to maximize end-on fire (which was emphasized by those who favored ramming attacks).

By the time the design for these new ships was being finalized in early 1880, very large guns had fallen out of favor in the French Navy, so new 52-ton guns were substituted. The Navy had intended to build all four vessels to the same design, but after work began on the first vessel in June 1880, the shipyard realized that Huin's design, which had been modified dozens of times by different elements in the French naval command, was unworkable. The proposed hull dimensions were insufficient for the weight of armament to be carried. The shipyard engineers proposed widening the beam and increasing displacement to correct the problem, but Hoche was too far advanced in construction to allow the necessary changes without breaking up the existing hull structure. The other three ships, which became the Marceaus, had not been laid down and could be modified, and they retained the barbettes of the earlier ships.

=== Characteristics and machinery ===
Line-drawing of Marceau in 1908

The ships of the Marceau class were 98.6 m (323 ft 6 in) long between perpendiculars, with a beam of 20.06 to 20.19 m (65 ft 10 in to 66 ft 3 in) and a draft of 8.23 to 8.43 m (27 ft 0 in to 27 ft 8 in). They displaced 10,558 long tons (10,727 t). As was customary for French capital ships of the era, their hull featured a pronounced tumblehome shape and incorporated a ram bow. Marceau was completed with a comparatively light superstructure, but Neptune and Magenta received very large structures that contributed to poor stability. The ships' hulls were divided into watertight compartments by thirteen transverse bulkheads and seventeen longitudinal bulkheads. A double bottom further improved the ships' resistance to damage below the waterline. The hulls were constructed with iron, but their superstructures were largely composed of steel to save weight.

Steering was controlled from a small conning tower directly aft of the forward main battery gun. Marceau was fitted with a pair of pole masts equipped with fighting tops that carried some of her light guns and spotted for her main battery. Magenta had a heavy military mast in place of her forward pole mast, and both of Neptune's masts were of the heavy variety. Their crews ranged from 643 to 651 officers and enlisted men.

Marceau's propulsion machinery consisted of a pair of compound steam engines that each drove a screw propeller, while Magenta and Neptune had four such engines driving a pair of shafts. Steam was provided by eight coal-burning fire-tube boilers aboard Marceau and Magenta, but Neptune was fitted with twelve of the boilers. In the early 1900s, the ships were modernized with sixteen Niclausse boilers, which were water-tube models. All three ships' boilers were ducted into a single funnel just aft of the conning tower. Their engines were rated to produce 11,000 indicated horsepower (8,200 kW) for a top speed of 16 knots (30 km/h; 18 mph). Coal storage amounted to 600 to 740 t (590 to 730 long tons; 660 to 820 short tons).

=== Armament and armor ===
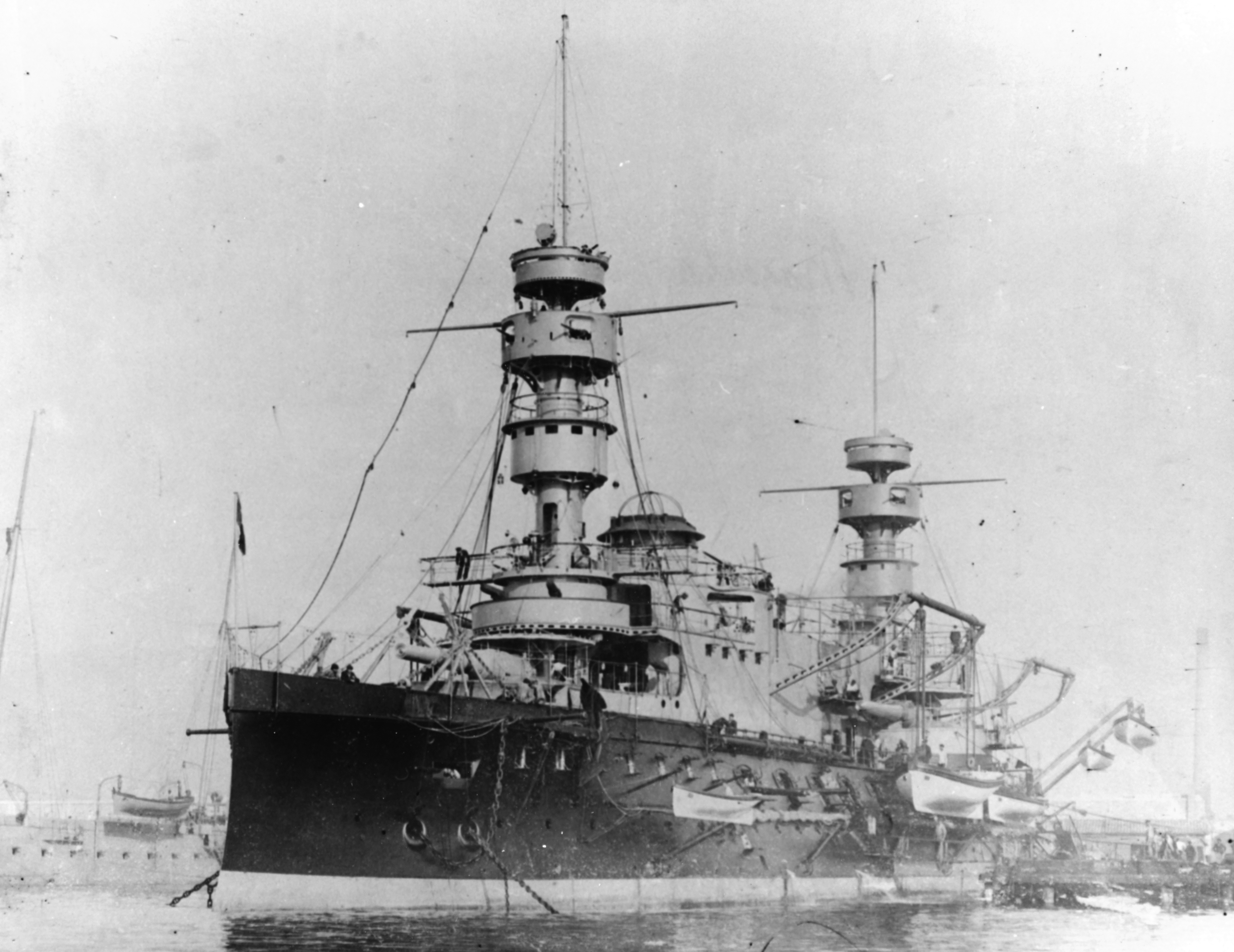
Magenta early in her career; note her significantly larger superstructure compared to Marceau

Their main armament consisted of four 340 mm (13.4 in) Modèle 1881 or Mle 1884, 28-caliber (cal.) guns mounted in individual barbette mounts. One was forward and one aft, both on the centerline, and two were amidships in wing mounts. Marceau received two of each model of the guns, while Neptune carried four Mle 1884 guns and Magenta mounted four of the Mle 1881 weapons. Both versions fired 350 kg (770 lb) high-explosive shells filled with melinite with a muzzle velocity of 555 m/s (1,820 ft/s). The main guns were supported by a secondary battery of sixteen 138 mm (5.4 in) 30-cal. Mle 1884 guns, all carried in individual pivot mounts in an unarmored gun battery in the hull, eight guns per broadside. They fired 30 kg (66 lb) high-explosive shells at a muzzle velocity of 590 m/s (1,900 ft/s).

For defense against torpedo boats, the ships carried an extensive battery of light guns, though the numbers vary between sources. Gardiner reports a range of three to six 65 mm (2.6 in) guns, nine to eighteen 47 mm (1.9 in) 3-pounder guns, eight to twelve 37 mm (1.5 in) 1-pounder five-barrel Hotchkiss revolving cannon; naval historian Eric Gille gives four to seven 65 mm guns, nine to twelve 47 mm guns, and eight 37 mm guns; naval historian Paul Silverstone says six 65 mm guns and twelve 47 mm guns. There is similar disagreement over the torpedo armament, with Gardiner providing three to five 380 mm (15 in) torpedo tubes, Gille reporting five to six tubes, and Silverstone stating five tubes. According to the contemporary The Naval Annual, the ships were equipped with four tubes, two on each broadside.

The ships were protected with a combination of mild steel and compound armor that varied between each member of the class. Their belt extended for the entire length of the hull and was approximately 2.3 m (7.5 ft) wide; 0.61 to 0.76 m (2 to 2.5 ft) of the belt was above the waterline. The armor belt was backed by a layer of teak that was used to help contain the effects of a shell hit. It was 457 mm (18 in) at the upper edge in the central portion, where it protected the ships' ammunition magazines and propulsion machinery spaces, tapering to 356 mm (14 in) at the bottom edge. Toward the bow, the belt was reduced to 254 mm (10 in) at the top edge and 229 mm (9 in) at the bottom, while the stern section received slightly thicker protection, at 305 mm (12 in) and 254 mm, respectively. Marceau and Neptune had compound armor belts, while Magenta's was steel. An armor deck that was 80 mm (3.1 in) of wrought iron atop a layer of 10 mm (0.4 in) of steel was attached to the upper edge of the belt. Above the belt, the ships had a cofferdam that was filled with cellulose forward; this structure was intended to limit flooding in the event of damage above the waterline.

The barbettes for the main battery were 406 mm (16 in) thick and the supporting tubes that connected them to their magazines were 203 to 229 mm (8 to 9 in); Marceau's barbettes were steel while the other two ships had compound armor. According to a contemporary British report, the magazines were not directly protected and instead relied on the side and horizontal armor for protection. The guns themselves were covered by 64 mm (2.5 in) thick gun shields, which were intended to protect their crews from light weapons and small arms fire. Their forward conning tower was 120 to 150 mm (4.7 to 6 in) thick.

== Construction ==
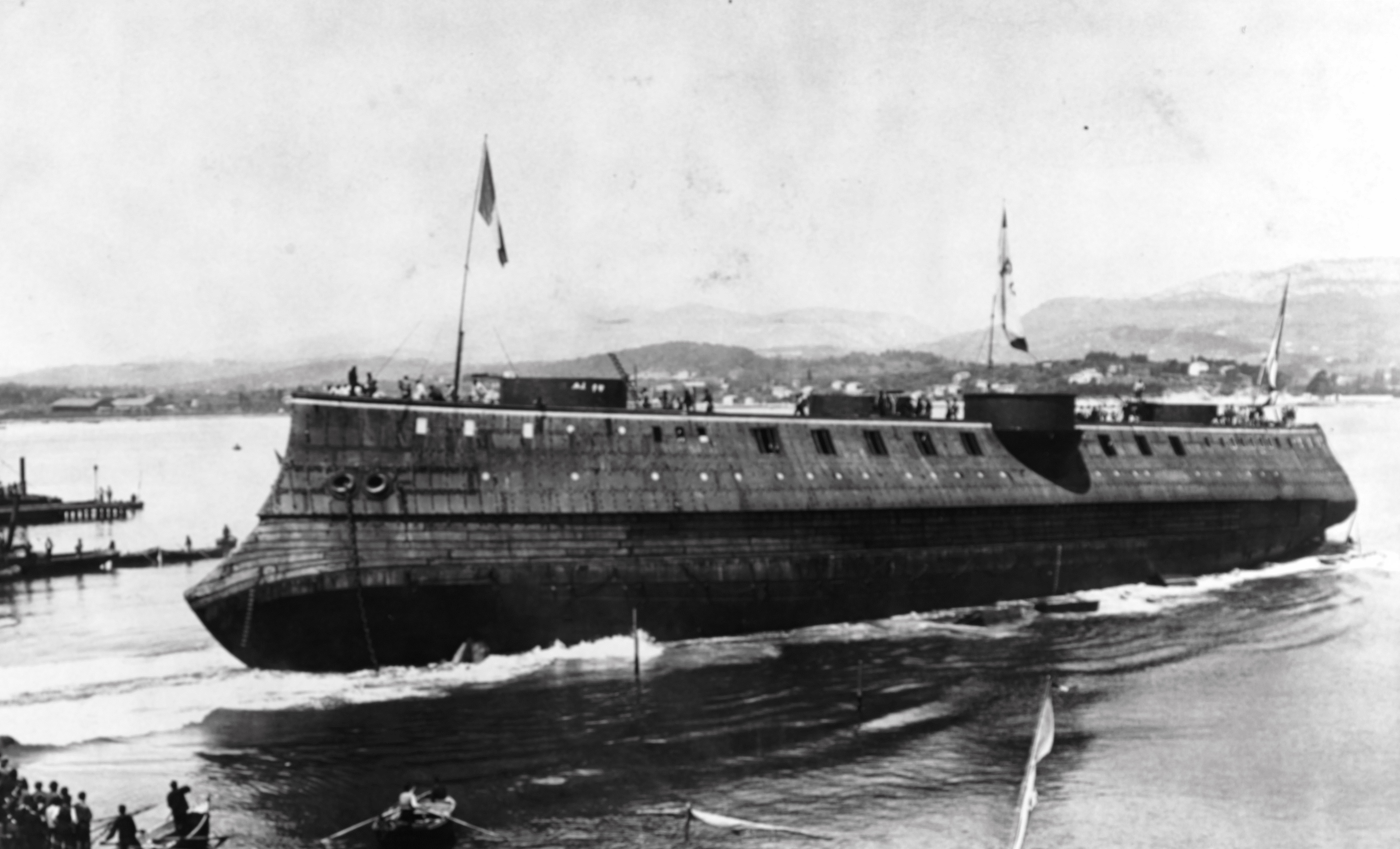
Marceau at her launching on 24 May 1887

The ships of the class took around a decade to complete, far longer than should have been the case. Construction of the vessels was hampered by an inefficient system in France that lacked a centralized command structure that instead relied on separate construction and materiel organizations that shared responsibilities. Additionally, the French Navy continued to build large numbers of ships slowly, which was not a sustainable practice in a period of rapid developments in naval technology. As a result, ad hoc changes were made to ships while under construction, which further delayed their completion as outdated features had to be removed, more advanced equipment developed and installed, all the while modifying the ships' design to ensure they retained stability and did not become overloaded.

The problems with French administration were compounded with changes in leadership that brought major shifts in construction priorities. Admiral Théophile Aube, who was the Minister of Marine in 1886–1887, was a staunch advocate of the so-called Jeune École and opposed new battleship construction in favor of cheaper torpedo boats. He halted work on the ships during his tenure, which further delayed their completion.

According to the historian Theodore Ropp, "the constant tinkering with the designs...proved to be little short of disastrous", noting the dangerous instability (which afflicted Magenta in particular), their overloaded condition that largely submerged their armor belts, and their towering superstructures that rendered them large targets. Worse still, they took so long to complete that by the time they entered service, the first pre-dreadnought battleships of the Royal Sovereign class had been completed, which far surpassed the Marceaus in combat effectiveness.

Name	Builder	Laid down	Launched	Completed
Marceau	Forges et Chantiers de la Méditerranée, La Seyne-sur-Mer	27 January 1882	24 May 1887	14 March 1891
Neptune	Arsenal de Brest, Brest	February 1882	7 May 1887	July 1892
Magenta	Arsenal de Toulon, Toulon	January 1883	April 1890	February 1893

== Service history ==
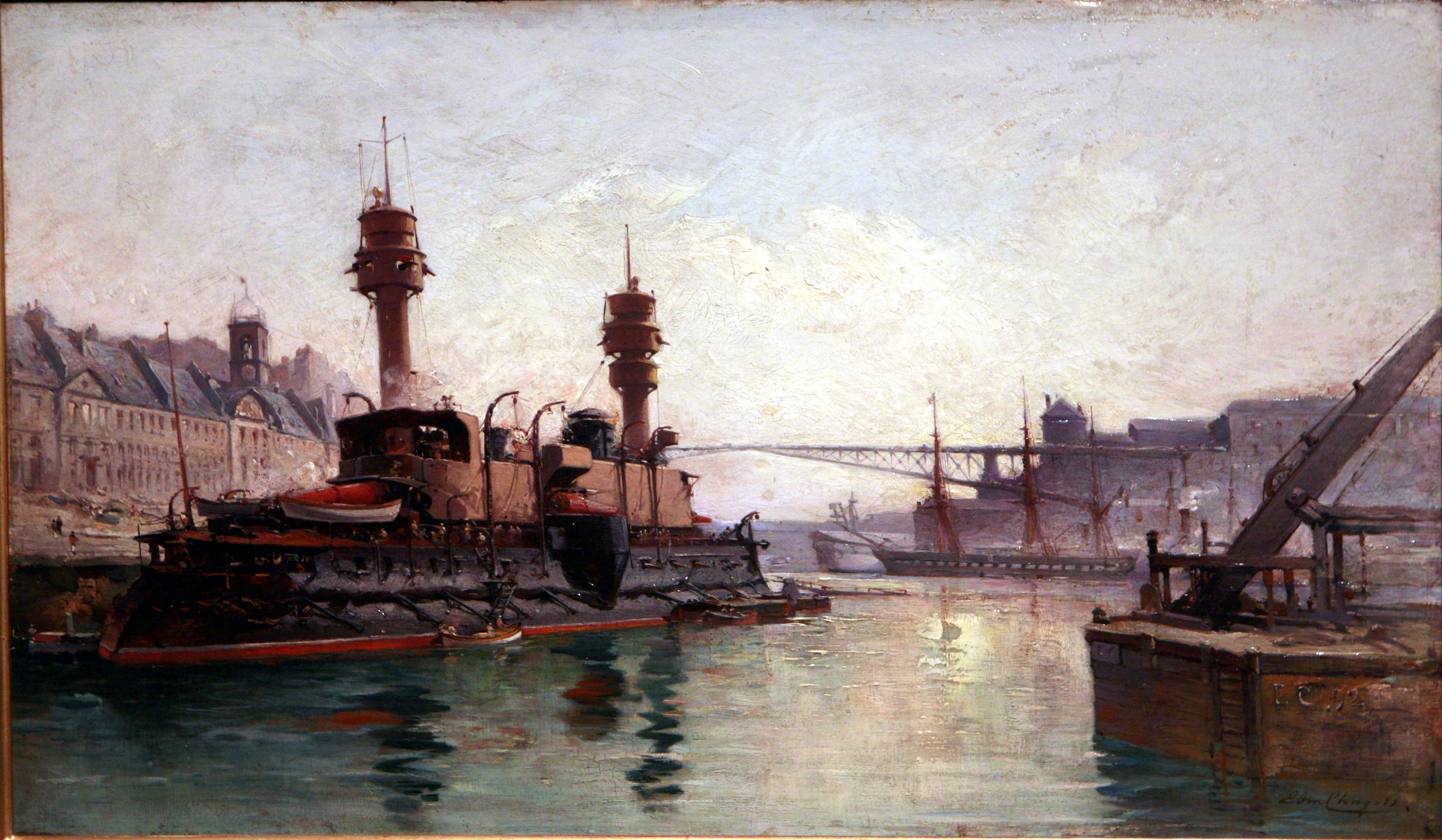
Neptune on the Penfeld in Brest, oil on canvas by Edmond Chagot

After entering service, Marceau initially went on a voyage to Russia with several other vessels to mark the signing of the Franco-Russian Alliance in 1891. She then joined the Mediterranean Squadron, France's front-line fleet unit. She was joined there by the other two ships in 1893 after they were commissioned. The ships had relatively uneventful careers, and over the rest of the decade, the three ships were primarily occupied with annual training maneuvers. In 1897, Marceau and Neptune helped to evaluate a new fire-control system. Magenta was involved in tests with the new submarine Gustave Zédé in 1898, where the submarine scored two hits with practice torpedoes. All three vessels were reduced to training ships in 1899, as a number of new pre-dreadnought battleships had been built, taking their place as front-line warships. The Marceaus were thereafter assigned to the Reserve Division of the Mediterranean Squadron for torpedo and gunnery training.

All three ships were modernized with new boilers in the early 1900s, including reductions in their top-heavy superstructures and heavy masts and installation of water-tube boilers. Regardless, they saw limited use after returning to service. Marceau and Magenta resumed training duties in 1903, though Neptune saw no further use. During parliamentary debates in 1908, the waste of funds that had been spent modernizing Neptune was highlighted, and she was struck from the naval register either that year, or in 1913. Magenta was also struck in 1910, and Marceau became a floating workshop to support torpedo boats and submarines after the start of World War I in August 1914. She was sold to ship breakers in 1921, but while under tow from Bizerte to Toulon, she ran aground in a storm and could not be pulled free; her wreck remained visible until the 1930s.
