= French battleship Brennus =

Pre-dreadnought battleship built for the French Navy

- Brennus underway after her reconstruction, 1896

Class overview
- Preceded by: Marceau class
- Succeeded by: Charles Martel

History

France
- Name: Brennus
- Namesake: Brennus, a Gallic chieftain
- Ordered: 1888
- Builder: Arsenal de Lorient
- Laid down: 2 January 1889
- Launched: 17 October 1891
- Decommissioned: 1 April 1914
- In service: 11 January 1896
- Reclassified: As training ship, 15 November 1909
- Stricken: 22 August 1919
- Fate: Scrapped, 1922

General characteristics
- Type: Pre-dreadnought battleship
- Displacement: 11,370 t (11,190 long tons) (deep load)
- Length: 110.3 m (361 ft 11 in) (p/p); 114.46 m (375 ft 6 in) (o/a)
- Beam: 20.4 m (66 ft 11 in)
- Draft: 8.28 m (27 ft 2 in)
- Installed power: 32 Belleville boilers; 12,500 PS (9,200 kW)
- Propulsion: 2 shafts; 2 triple-expansion steam engines
- Speed: 17 knots (31 km/h; 20 mph)
- Range: 2,805 nmi (5,195 km; 3,228 mi) at 11 knots (20 km/h; 13 mph)
- Complement: 667
- Armament: 3 × 340 mm (13.4 in) guns; 10 × 164.7 mm (6.5 in) guns; 4 × 65 mm (2.6 in); 14 × 47 mm (1.9 in) guns; 8 × 37 mm (1.5 in) Hotchkiss guns; 6 × 37 mm 5-barrel revolver cannon; 4 × 450 mm (17.7 in) torpedo tubes
- Armor: Belt: 300–400 mm (11.8–15.7 in); Deck: 60 mm (2.4 in); Conning tower: 120 mm (4.7 in); Main turrets: 405 or 455 mm (15.9 or 17.9 in)

Brennus was the first pre-dreadnought battleship built for the Marine Nationale (French Navy). Completed in 1896, she was the sole member of her class, with a main battery of heavy guns mounted on the centerline and the first use of Belleville boilers. She formed the basis for several subsequent designs, beginning with Charles Martel. As completed in 1893, the ship was very top-heavy and had to be rebuilt over the next three years before she was ready to enter service.

Brennus spent the majority of her service in the Mediterranean Squadron, and she served as its flagship early in her career. In 1900, she accidentally rammed and sank the destroyer Framée. As newer battleships were commissioned into the fleet, Brennus was relegated to the Reserve Squadron in the early 1900s and then served as a training ship. The vessel had been decommissioned before the First World War began in August 1914 and was disarmed in 1915. She served as a source of spare parts and equipment for other ships during the war. Her hulk was stricken from the naval register in 1919 and was ultimately scrapped three years later.

== Design ==
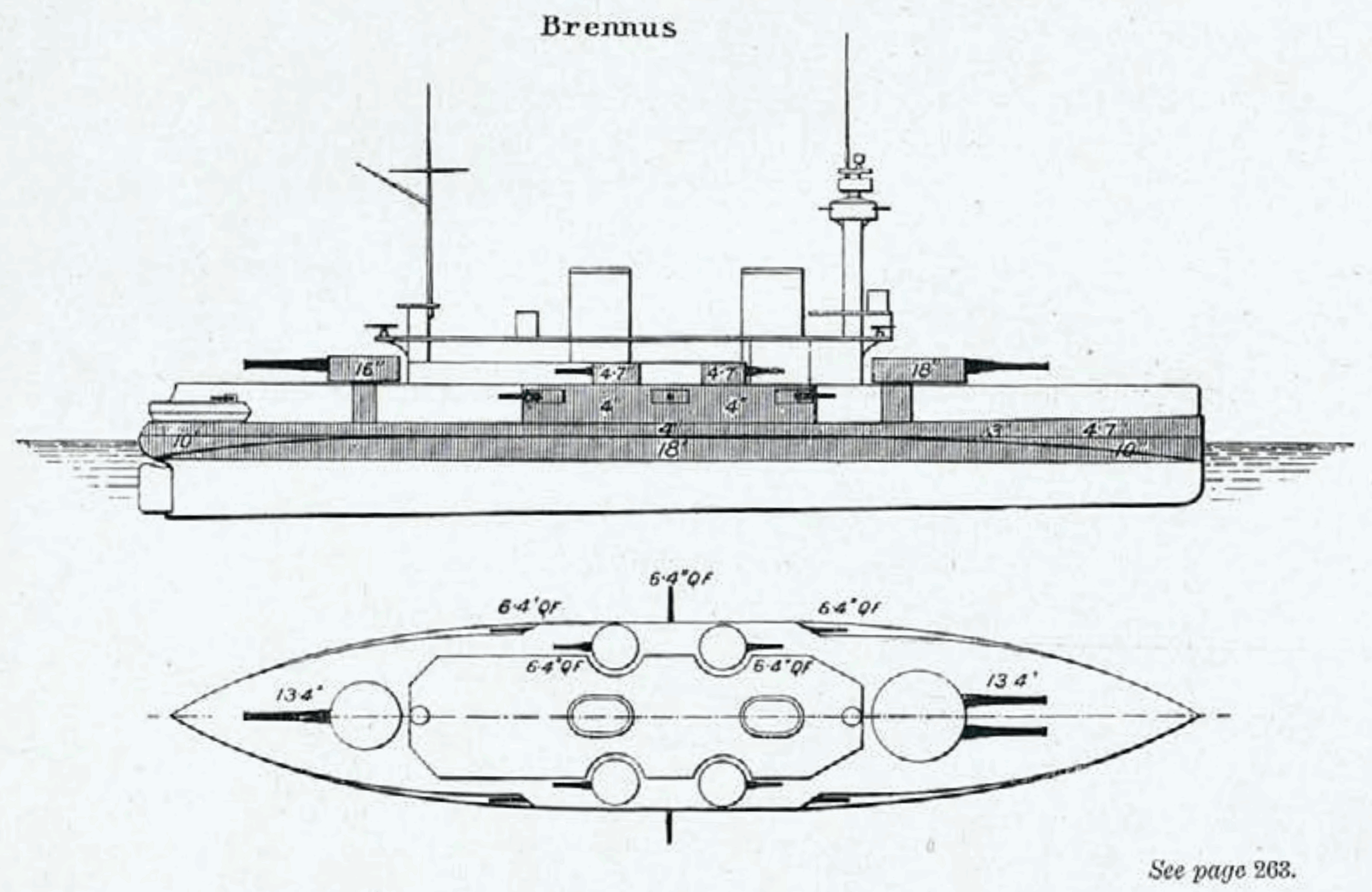
Line-drawing of Brennus in her final configuration

In 1880, the French Navy embarked on a naval construction program that included the ironclad battleships Hoche and the three-ship Marceau class; the program called for two more vessels, which were to be laid down in 1882. The first of these was to have been named Brennus and work began in 1885. Admiral Théophile Aube, who opposed battleship construction in favor of the cheaper torpedo boats and cruisers of the Jeune École, became the Naval Minister and cancelled both ships in January 1886 before much work had been done. Aube left the government in 1887 and his successor permitted work to resume; the ship's designer, Charles Ernest Huin, lobbied to restart construction to keep the shipyards busy. He re-designed Brennus to meet new requirements and the design was approved in 1889, allowing work to resume. The sections of hull that had been assembled on the slipway were dismantled, with the steel used elsewhere in the new ship. The fact that the same slipway was used to build both vessels, and parts of the original were reused in the latter vessel has caused some to conflate the vessels. The two ships were, nevertheless, distinct vessels. The second Brennus was ordered in 1888.

Brennus was the first pre-dreadnought-style battleship built in the French Navy; the previous Magenta-class ships were barbette ships, a type of ironclad battleship. The ship introduced several advances for the French fleet: new, 42-caliber guns arranged in turrets forward and aft of the superstructure, the first use of homogeneous steel armor, and the first Belleville boilers. Other changes included the adoption of a thin upper strake of armor to protect against quick-firing guns and the abandonment of the ram bow. Brennus formed the basis for the subsequent group of five broadly similar battleships built to the same design specifications, begun with Charles Martel, though they reverted to the armament layout of the earlier Magentas which saw the main guns distributed in single turrets in a lozenge (quadrilateral) pattern.

=== General characteristics and machinery ===
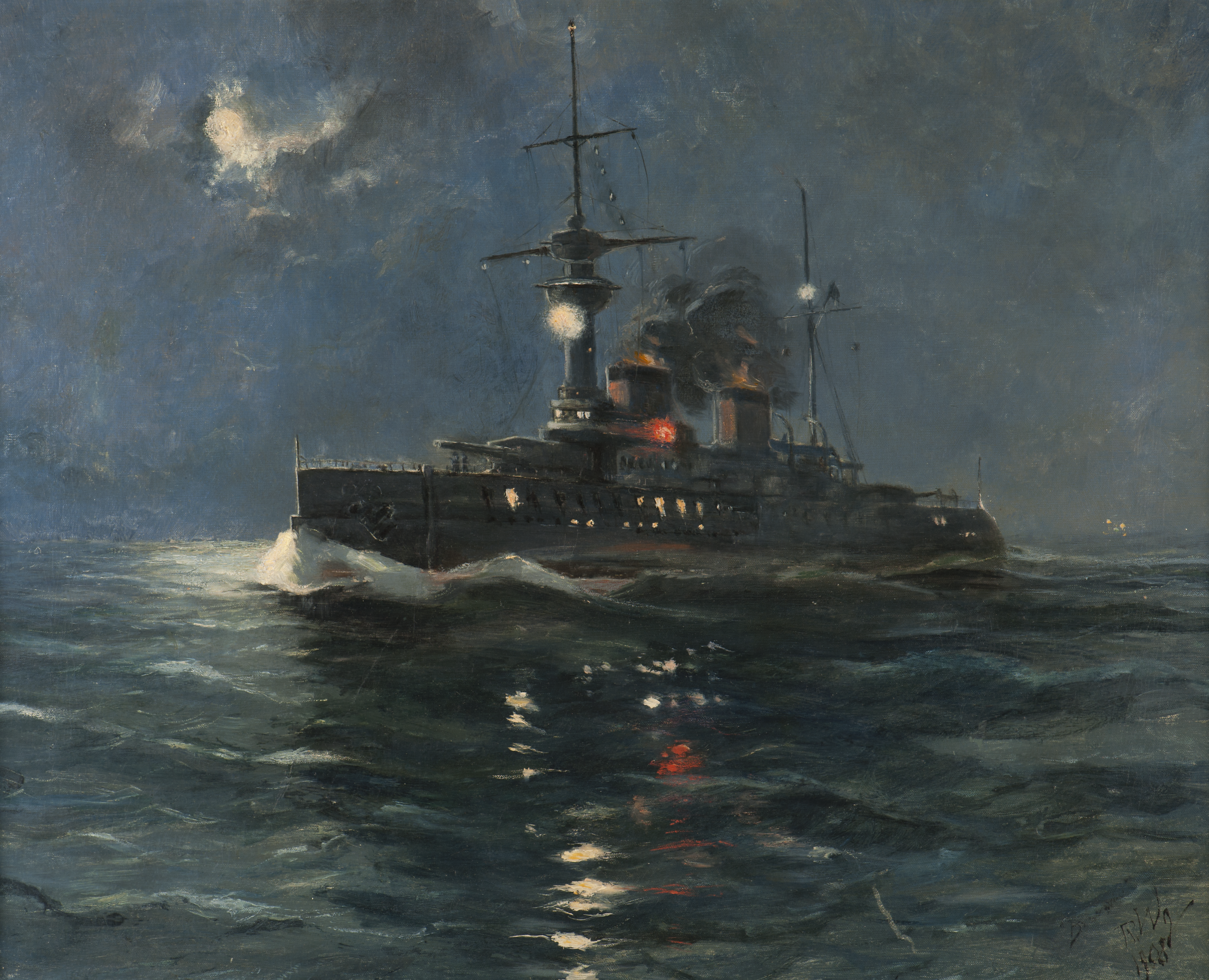
Painting of Brennus

Brennus was 110.3 meters (361 ft 11 in) long between perpendiculars and 114.46 meters (375 ft 6 in) long overall. The ship had a beam of 20.4 m (66 ft 11 in), a draft of 8.28 m (27 ft 2 in). and displaced 11,370 metric tons (11,190 long tons) at deep load, after her reconstruction. Brennus proved to be grossly overweight; during her initial sea trials in 1893, her draft was 38 cm (15 in) greater than it should have been, and this was not in a fully loaded condition. The increased draft submerged most of the ship's armored belt, rendering it largely useless. Her hull was subdivided by 18 watertight bulkheads and she had a double bottom that extended over the full length of the hull except at the bow. Brennus had a crew of 667 officers and enlisted men.

The ship suffered from very poor stability, largely a result of her massive superstructure that placed a great deal of weight high in the ship. These problems were not fully solved by extensive reconstruction between 1893 and 1896, which contributed to a short career. Her first stability trial was conducted on 17 June 1893 with all her guns traversed to starboard and her entire crew mustered on the same side; Brennus took on a 28° list and the barrels of her 164.7 mm casemate guns were half-submerged. Her metacentric height was calculated at 0.75 m (2.5 ft) during this incident. The ship's excessive topweight from her massive superstructure, heavy military masts and tall funnels contributed to the problem, together with the pronounced tumblehome of her hull.

Brennus had a pair of four-cylinder vertical triple-expansion steam engines, each driving a single 5.4-meter (17 ft 9 in), four-bladed propeller, using steam supplied by 32 Belleville water-tube boilers at a working pressure of 17 kg/cm^{2} (1,667 kPa; 242 psi). The boilers exhausted into a pair of large funnels located amidships. The decision to fit Brennus with water-tube boilers was made in 1887, and she was the first large ship to be equipped with them. Her engines were rated at 12,500 metric horsepower (9,200 kW), which was intended to allow the ship to steam at a speed of 17 knots (31 km/h; 20 mph); during her sea trials on 9 January 1896, Brennus reached a maximum speed of 17.1 knots (31.7 km/h; 19.7 mph) from 14,133 PS (10,395 kW). The ship could carry 706 t (695 long tons) of coal, which gave her a range of 2,805 nautical miles (5,195 km; 3,228 mi) at a speed of 11 knots (20 km/h; 13 mph). Electricity for lighting, searchlights, pumps, ventilators and other equipment was provided by four 400-ampere dynamos, each driven by a dedicated internal-combustion engine.

=== Armament and armor ===
Brennus after her main mast had been reduced

Brennus's main battery consisted of three 42-caliber Canon de 340 mm (13.4 in) Modèle 1887 guns, two in a twin turret forward of the superstructure, and the third in a single turret aft. They fired 420-kilogram (930 lb) cast iron (CI) projectiles, or heavier 490-kilogram (1,080 lb) armor-piercing, capped (APC) and semi-armor-piercing, capped (SAPC) shells at a muzzle velocity of 740 to 780 meters per second (2,400 to 2,600 ft/s). At their maximum elevation of +10°, the guns had a range of 10,900 meters (11,900 yd). Designed to have a rate of fire of one round per two minutes, the actual rate of fire was about half that in service. The ship initially stowed 39 shells for each gun, but this was later increased to 61. The ship's secondary armament consisted of ten 45-caliber Canon de 164.7 mm (6.5 in) Modèle 1893 guns, four of which were mounted in single turrets amidships; the other six were located directly underneath them in casemates. They had a muzzle velocity of 730 to 770 m/s (2,400 to 2,500 ft/s) when firing their 30-kilogram (66 lb) CI or 35-kilogram (77 lb) AP or SAP shells. The guns had a range of 10,450 meters (11,430 yd) at their maximum elevation of +20°.

For defense against torpedo boats, Brennus was equipped with a suite of quick-firing guns, the largest of which were four 50-caliber Canon de 65 mm (2.6 in) Modèle 1891 guns in single unshielded mounts on the fore and aft superstructure. Their 4-kilogram (8.8 lb) shells had a muzzle velocity of 715 m/s (2,350 ft/s) which gave them a range of 5,500 meters (6,000 yd). The suite was rounded out by fourteen 40-caliber 47 mm (1.9 in) Modèle 1885 guns and fourteen 37 mm (1.5 in) Modèle 1885 Hotchkiss guns, of which six of the latter were 5-barrel revolver cannon. All of these guns were positioned in the fighting tops on the military masts and in the superstructure. The ship was also fitted with four above-water 450-millimeter (17.7 in) torpedo tubes on rotating mounts, two on each broadside. She carried two Modèle 1889 torpedoes for each tube. The torpedoes had two speed and range settings: 600 m (660 yd) at 29.5 kn (54.6 km/h; 33.9 mph) or 800 m (870 yd) at 28 kn (51.9 km/h; 32.2 mph).

Brennus's armor mostly consisted of nickel steel. The 2.1-meter-high (6 ft 11 in) waterline belt was 400 mm (15.7 in) thick amidships and tapered down to 250 mm (9.8 in) at its lower edge. Fore and aft of the armored citadel amidships, the belt reduced to 300 mm (11.8 in) at the waterline; forward its lower edge tapered to a thickness of 200 mm (7.9 in), but aft the belt tapered to 180 mm (7.1 in) on its bottom edge. The main armored deck was 60 mm (2.4 in) thick. The forward turret and its barbette were protected by armor plates 455 mm (17.9 in) thick, while those of the aft turret and its barbette were 405 mm (15.9 in) thick. The turret roofs were 80 mm (3.1 in) thick. The armor protecting the casemates and secondary gun turrets had a thickness of 100 mm (3.9 in). The conning tower had 120 mm (4.7 in) thick sides.

== Construction and career ==
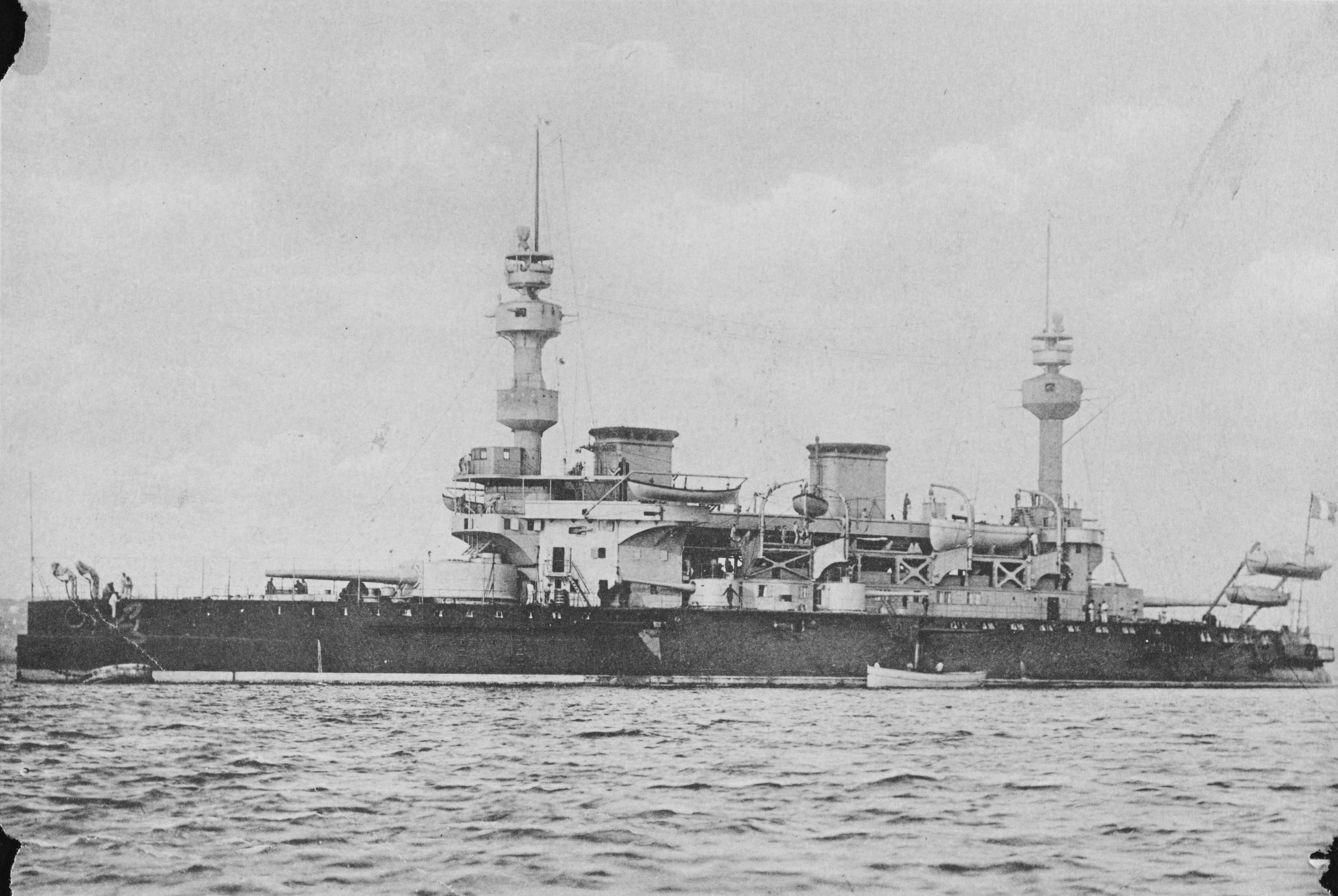
Brennus in her original configuration, c. 1894

Brennus, named after the Gallic chieftain, was laid down at the Arsenal de Lorient on 2 January 1889 and launched on 17 October 1891. Fitting-out work was completed in 1893, but serious problems with her stability delayed her commissioning. The day after her stability trials on 17 June, the shipyard was notified that there would be a seven-month delay in the delivery of her propellers and the Marine Nationale decided that the ship would use the propellers from the ironclad Neptune in the interim. Brennus steamed to Brest on 2 August where some 70 t (69 long tons) of material were removed and she conducted preliminary steam trials on 5 September. The following month, the Arsenal de Brest submitted a proposal to lighten the ship which it estimated was 412 t (405 long tons) overweight, which was approved on 30 October.

To reduce the ship's excessive topweight, the bridge wings and the overhang of the bridge over the main-gun turrets was eliminated. More importantly, the top deck of the superstructure was removed and the aft military mast was replaced by a pole mast. To further reduce weight, the torpedo nets were removed and the boat stowage was lowered by one deck. To improve her stability, a watertight caisson (soufflage) was added at the waterline over her belt armor. The opportunity was taken to replace her propellers and the 164.7 mm Modèle 1887 guns initially installed were replaced by the latest model.

The ship began her preliminary sea trials in August 1895 and a second stability trial was conducted on 22 December that showed a metacentric height of 1.047 m (3 ft 5.2 in). Despite these modifications, the ship was not fully satisfactory. A report by Capitaine de vaisseau (Captain) Joseph Besson, the ship's first commander, stated:

The ship has good qualities but also major defects. The most serious problem is that when engaging on the broadside the ship is effectively unarmoured. The 340 mm turrets are too heavy and are not balanced, and when both are trained on the same beam the heel of the ship is such that the upper edge of the belt is level with the water. This means that the only side protection against enemy shell is provided by the 10 cm upper belt. The thickness of the armour belt at its lower edge—only 25 cm—and the large turning circle are further weaknesses.

=== 1896–1900 ===
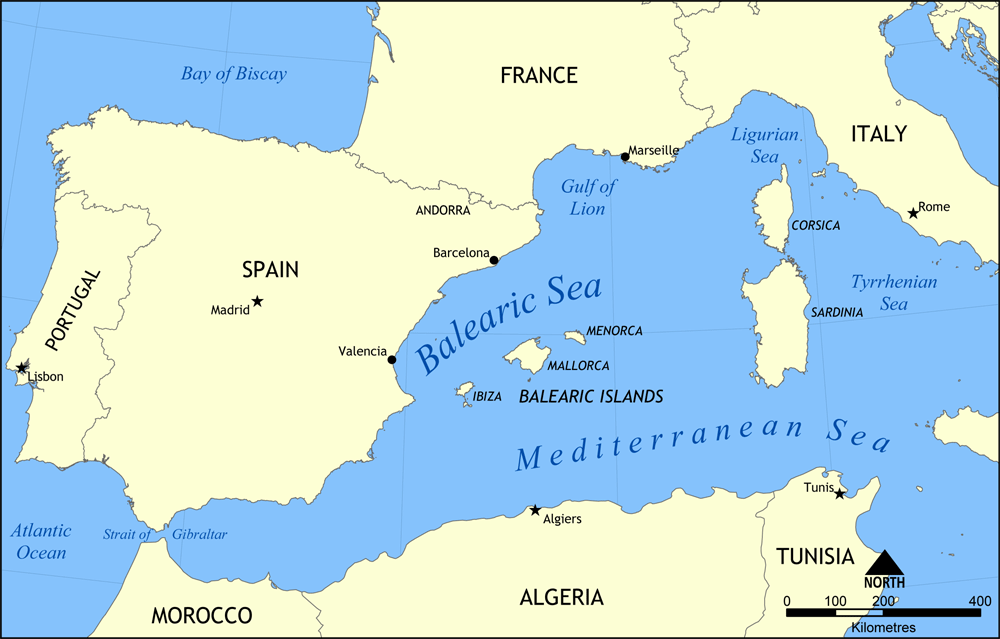
Map of the western Mediterranean, where Brennus spent the majority of her peacetime career

Brennus finally entered service on 11 January 1896 at a cost of F25,083,675, although her post-trials refit made her unavailable until 1 April. Despite her problems, as the most modern capital ship of the French fleet, she served as the flagship of the Mediterranean Squadron under Vice-amiral (Vice admiral) Alfred Gervais. While towing targets for the other ships in her squadron on 24 August, the ship was accidentally fired upon by the torpedo cruiser Vautour; one man was wounded in the incident. Gervais was relieved by Vice-amiral Jules de Cuverville on 15 October, who was replaced in his turn by Vice-amiral Edgar Humann on 15 October 1897. That year, the Marine Nationale issued a new doctrine for gunnery control. During gunnery training exercises to test the new system, Brennus and the ironclad battleships Neptune and Marceau achieved 26 percent hits at a range of 3,000 to 4,000 m (3,300 to 4,400 yd). Their success prompted the Navy to make this method the standard for the fleet in February 1898. On 16 April 1898, Félix Faure, President of France, boarded the ship to watch maneuvers. After their completion he suggested a race between the battleships; after two hours Brennus trailed the newer Charles Martel and Carnot, but beat four older ships.

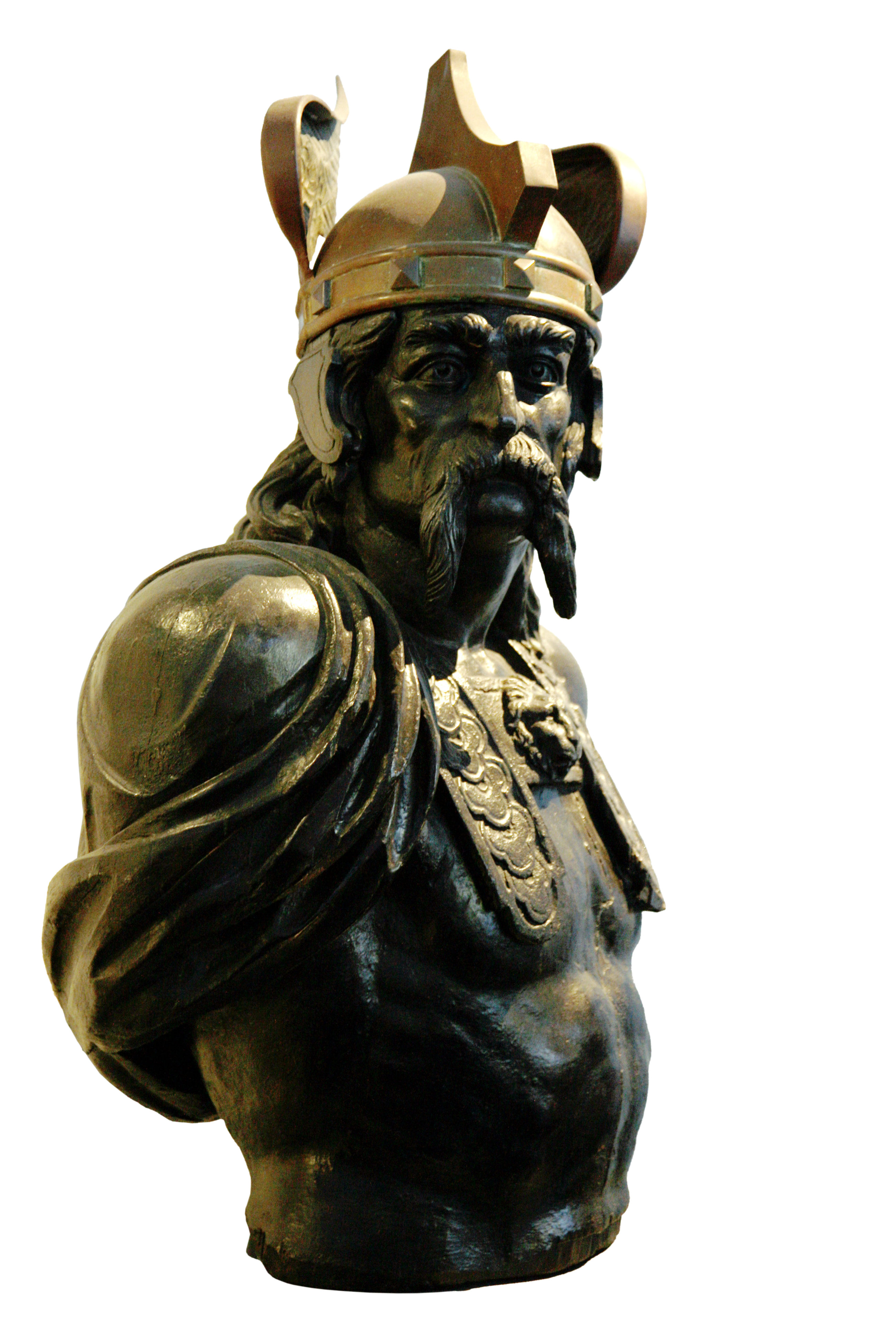
The ship's figurehead preserved at the Musée national de la Marine

The ship participated in the annual fleet maneuvers during 8–20 July. Navy Minister Édouard Lockroy then observed gunnery exercises aboard her in September that culminated with the sinking of the old floating battery Arrogante. Vice-amiral Ernest François Fournier hoisted his flag aboard Brennus as commander of the Mediterranean Squadron on 1 October. Capitaine de vaisseau Augustin Boué de Lapeyrère became captain of the ship that same day. Desiring a figurehead for his ship, he located an old one of the goddess Ceres in storage and ordered that she be refashioned into a Gaul. He also ordered his chief engineer to make a suitable copper helmet for the figurehead. Stowed below whenever the ship went to sea, Brennus was the last ship in the Marine Nationale to bear a figurehead. As tensions between France and Great Britain rose during the Fashoda Incident, the squadron's sailors had their leave canceled on 18 October and the battleships loaded their full complement of ammunition before disembarking it on 5 November when the two countries settled their differences.

During the squadron's cruise of the Eastern Mediterranean in October–December 1899, the ship hosted a dinner for Queen Olga of Greece before returning to Toulon on 21 December. During the 1900 maneuvers held from March to July, she served as Fournier's flagship. The Mediterranean Squadron: five other battleships, including Gaulois, Charlemagne, Charles Martel, Bouvet, and Jauréguiberry; four coast-defense ships; three armored cruisers; five protected cruisers, and a torpedo cruiser, along with a number of light craft. The exercises began on 6 March, and Brennus went to sea with four of the battleships and four protected cruisers for maneuvers off Golfe-Juan, including night-firing training. Throughout April, the ships visited numerous French ports along the Mediterranean coast, and on 31 May the fleet steamed to Corsica for a visit that lasted until 8 June. After completing its own exercises in the Mediterranean, the Mediterranean Squadron rendezvoused with the Northern Squadron off Lisbon, Portugal, in late June before proceeding to Quiberon Bay for joint maneuvers in July. The maneuvers concluded with a naval review in Cherbourg on 19 July for President Émile Loubet.

On 1 August, the Mediterranean Squadron departed for Toulon, arriving on 14 August. While cruising off Cape St. Vincent during the voyage back on the night of 10/11 August, Brennus accidentally collided with the destroyer Framée, sinking her and killing forty-seven of her crew; only fourteen men were rescued. After reaching Toulon, the fleet then departed a week later for gunnery training off Porquerolles. On 30 September she was replaced as the squadron flagship by the new battleship Saint Louis. The ship began a lengthy refit on 17 October that lasted until 1 June 1901.

=== 1901–1922 ===
After a port visit to Algiers, French Algeria, and participating in the annual fleet maneuvers, Brennus was assigned to the Division de réserve (Reserve Division) on 10 August 1901. Eight days later, Besson, now a contre-amiral (Rear Admiral), hoisted his flag aboard when he assumed command of the division that consisted of Carnot, the elderly ironclad battleships Hoche and Amiral Baudin, the torpedo boat tender Foudre and the torpedo gunboat La Hire. In this role, she spent most of the year with a reduced crew, which was augmented by naval reservists during the annual fleet maneuvers. After a short refit in January 1903, Brennus was one of the ships that visited Cartagena, in honor of King Alfonso XIII of Spain. Contre-amiral Horace Jauréguiberry relieved Besson on 10 September. He was relieved in his turn by Contre-amiral Paul-Louis Germinet on 10 August 1905. Navy Minister Gaston Thomson observed exercises aboard the battleship which visited Corsica and ports in southern France during 17–28 October.

For the 1906 maneuvers, Fournier came aboard his old flagship during the exercises. The maneuvers lasted from 3 July to 3 August, at which point the fleet returned to Toulon; the next day, the fleet dispersed. The transport SS Dives broke her anchor chain in Toulon harbor on 4 December and collided with Brennus. The battleship was not significantly damaged, but Dives ran aground. By the beginning of 1907, the Reserve Division had been enlarged into a squadron, but it was redesignated as the Division d'instruction (Training Division) on 15 February. There was a small fire on 12 June in the forward main-gun turret that badly burned the miscreant who had lit a gasoline-soaked rag. Brennus became a private ship on 16 August and she was reduced to reserve nine days later. The ship was assigned to the torpedo school on 15 November 1909 as a training ship and her main guns were modified to improve their rate of fire over the next two years. Brennus participated in a large naval review by President Armand Fallières off Cap Brun on 4 September. The following day she collided with the excursion ship SS Magali; there were no casualties aboard either ship, but Magali had to be beached lest she sink.

The battleship was again placed in reserve on 1 January 1912 and was paid off on 1 April 1914. During the First World War, she was hulked, cannibalized for spare parts and equipment, and was stripped of her main guns in 1915. Brennus was stricken from the naval register on 22 August 1919 and was listed for sale on 30 October. The ship was transferred on 13 January 1921 to the company that had salvaged the wreck of the pre-dreadnought battleship Liberté as payment for their work. She briefly served as a storeship before being broken up for scrap in 1922.
