= 340mm/28 Modèle 1881 gun =

340mm/28 Modèle 1881
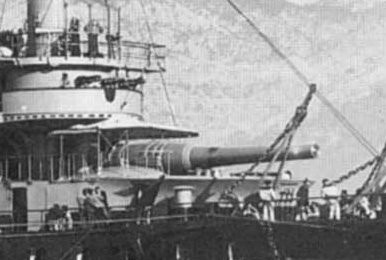
- A 340mm/28 Modèle 1881 aboard the Magenta
- Type: Naval gun
- Place of origin: France

Service history
- In service: 1881-1922
- Used by: France

Specifications
- Mass: 52.2 t (51.4 long tons; 57.5 short tons)
- Length: 9.7 m (32 ft) L/28.5 calibres
- Shell: Separate loading bagged charges and projectiles
- Shell weight: AP: 420.0 kg (925.9 lb); Common: 350.0 kg (771.6 lb)
- Calibre: 340 mm (13 in)
- Breech: Interrupted screw
- Muzzle velocity: 600 m/s (1,969 ft/s)

The 340mm/28 Modèle 1881 gun was a heavy naval gun of the French Navy.

== History ==
The type was used in single mountings on the ironclads of the Marceau class, and on the Hoche.

== Railway guns ==
Canon de 340 modèle 1881/84 à glissement
- Type: Railway gun
- Place of origin: France

Service history
- In service: 1919-?
- Used by: France

Production history
- Designer: Schneider
- Designed: 1917
- Manufacturer: Schneider
- Produced: 1918
- No. built: 8

Specifications
- Mass: 187 t (184 long tons; 206 short tons)
- Barrel length: 9.7 m (32 ft) L/28.5 calibres
- Shell: Separate loading bagged charges and projectiles
- Shell weight: 430 kg (950 lb)
- Caliber: 340 mm (13 in)
- Breech: Interrupted screw breech
- Recoil: Carriage recoil
- Carriage: Two six-axle bogies
- Elevation: +3° to +40°
- Traverse: None
- Rate of fire: 1 round every five minutes
- Muzzle velocity: 430 m/s (1,400 ft/s)
- Maximum firing range: 19 km (12 mi)

Eight guns were converted from naval use to railway guns by Schneider and designated Canon de 340 modèle 1881/84 à glissement. The conversions were ordered during 1917 but they weren't delivered until January 1919 after the war had ended. The guns were suspended from two six-axle rail bogies and used carriage recoil known as the glissement system. The guns had no traverse mechanism so aiming was done by drawing the guns across a section of curved track.

== See also ==
=== Weapons of comparable role, performance and era ===
- BL 13.5 inch naval gun Mk I – IV : British equivalent
