= French ironclad Hoche =

Ironclad warship of the French Navy

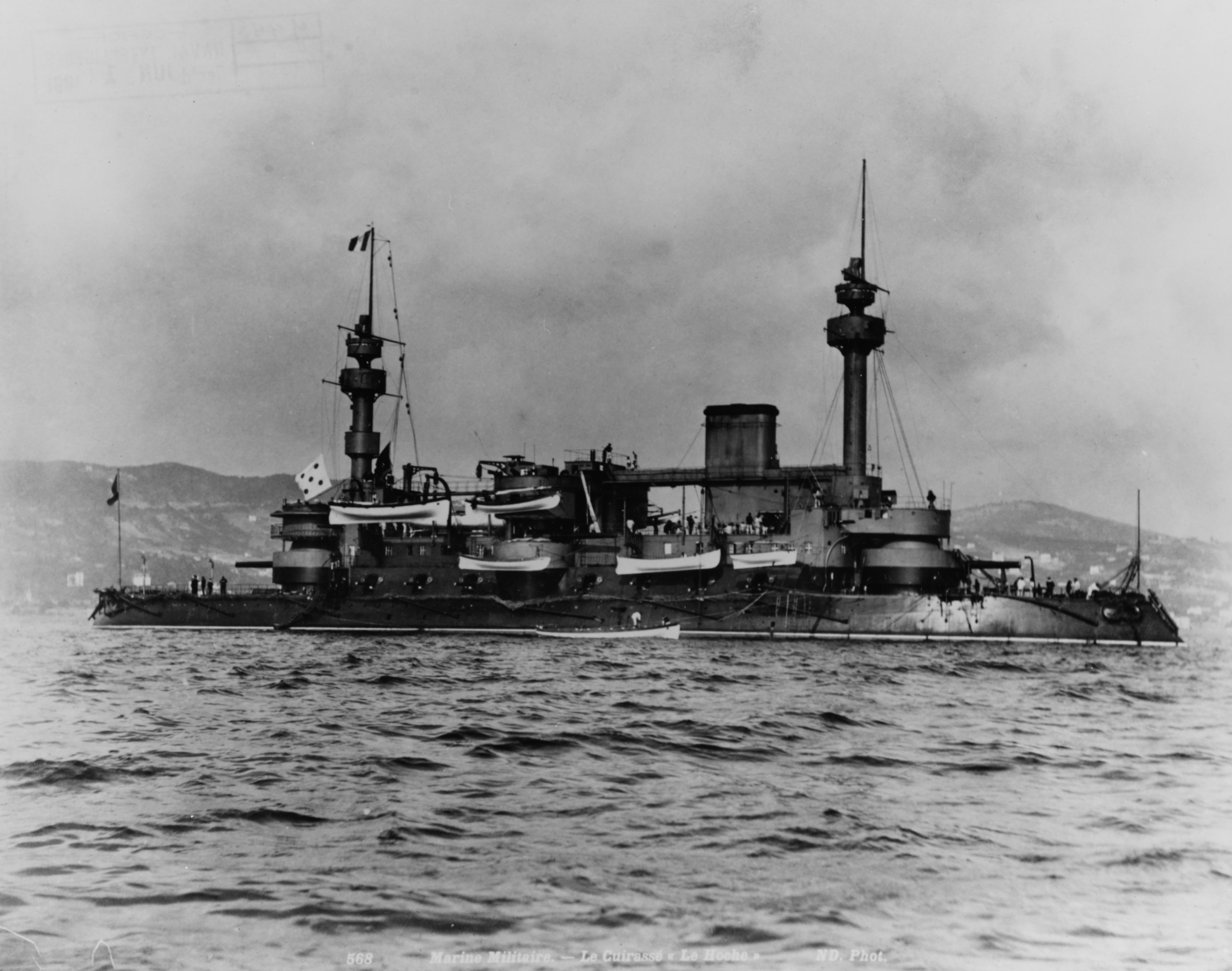
- Hoche shortly after entering service, c. 1891

Class overview
- Preceded by: Amiral Baudin class
- Succeeded by: Marceau class

History

France
- Name: Hoche
- Namesake: Lazare Hoche
- Ordered: 3 August 1880
- Builder: Arsenal de Lorient
- Launched: 29 September 1886
- Completed: 1890
- Decommissioned: April 1908
- Fate: Sunk as target in 1913

General characteristics
- Type: Barbette ship
- Displacement: 10,820 long tons (10,990 t)
- Length: 102.85 m (337 ft 5 in) lwl
- Beam: 20.22 m (66 ft 4 in)
- Draft: 8.31 m (27 ft 3 in)
- Installed power: 8 × fire-tube boilers; 12,000 ihp (8,900 kW)
- Propulsion: 2 × compound steam engines; 2 × screw propellers
- Speed: 16.5 knots (30.6 km/h; 19.0 mph)
- Complement: 611
- Armament: 2 × 340 mm (13 in) Modèle 1881 guns; 2 × 274 mm (10.8 in) Modèle 1881 guns; 18 × 138 mm (5.4 in) Modèle 1881 guns; 5 × 380 mm (15 in) torpedo tubes
- Armor: Belt: 254 to 457 mm (10 to 18 in); Deck: 79 mm (3.1 in); Conning tower: 64 mm (2.5 in); Barbettes: 406 mm (16 in)

General characteristics (1898 refit)
- Displacement: Full load: 10,580 long tons (10,750 t)
- Installed power: 16 × Belleville water-tube boilers
- Propulsion: 2 × triple-expansion steam engines
- Armament: 2 × 340 mm (13 in) Modèle 1881 guns; 2 × 274 mm (10.8 in) Modèle 1881 guns; 12 × 138 mm (5.4 in) Modèle 1893 guns; 3 × 380 mm (15 in) torpedo tubes

Hoche was an ironclad battleship built as a hybrid barbette–turret ship for the French Navy in the 1880s. Originally designed in response to very large Italian ironclads along the lines of the French Amiral Baudin class, by the time work on Hoche began, changes in French design philosophy led to a radical re-design that provided the basis for a generation of French capital ships. Her armament was reduced in size compared to the Amiral Baudins, and was placed in the lozenge arrangement that would be used for most French capital ships into the 1890s. Hoche suffered from serious stability problems that resulted from her large superstructure and low freeboard, which required extensive work later in her career to correct. The ship incorporated new technologies for the French Navy, including gun turrets for some of her main battery guns and compound armor plate.

Hoche initially served with the Northern Squadron after entering service in 1890, but was sent to the Mediterranean Squadron the following year. She remained there for the next four years, during which time she accidentally rammed and sank a merchant vessel outside Marseille. In 1895, she was moved back to the Northern Squadron, and that year she visited Germany for the opening of the Kaiser Wilhelm Canal. The ship remained in the unit until 1898, when she was decommissioned to be thoroughly reconstructed. Work was completed in 1901, and she served briefly with the Northern Squadron that year before being transferred to the Reserve Division of the Mediterranean Squadron in 1902. She spent the next several years in a state with reduced crews, being activated to take part in training exercises with the rest of the fleet. She remained assigned to the Reserve Division through 1908, but saw no further service; she was ultimately sunk as a target ship in 1913.

== Design ==
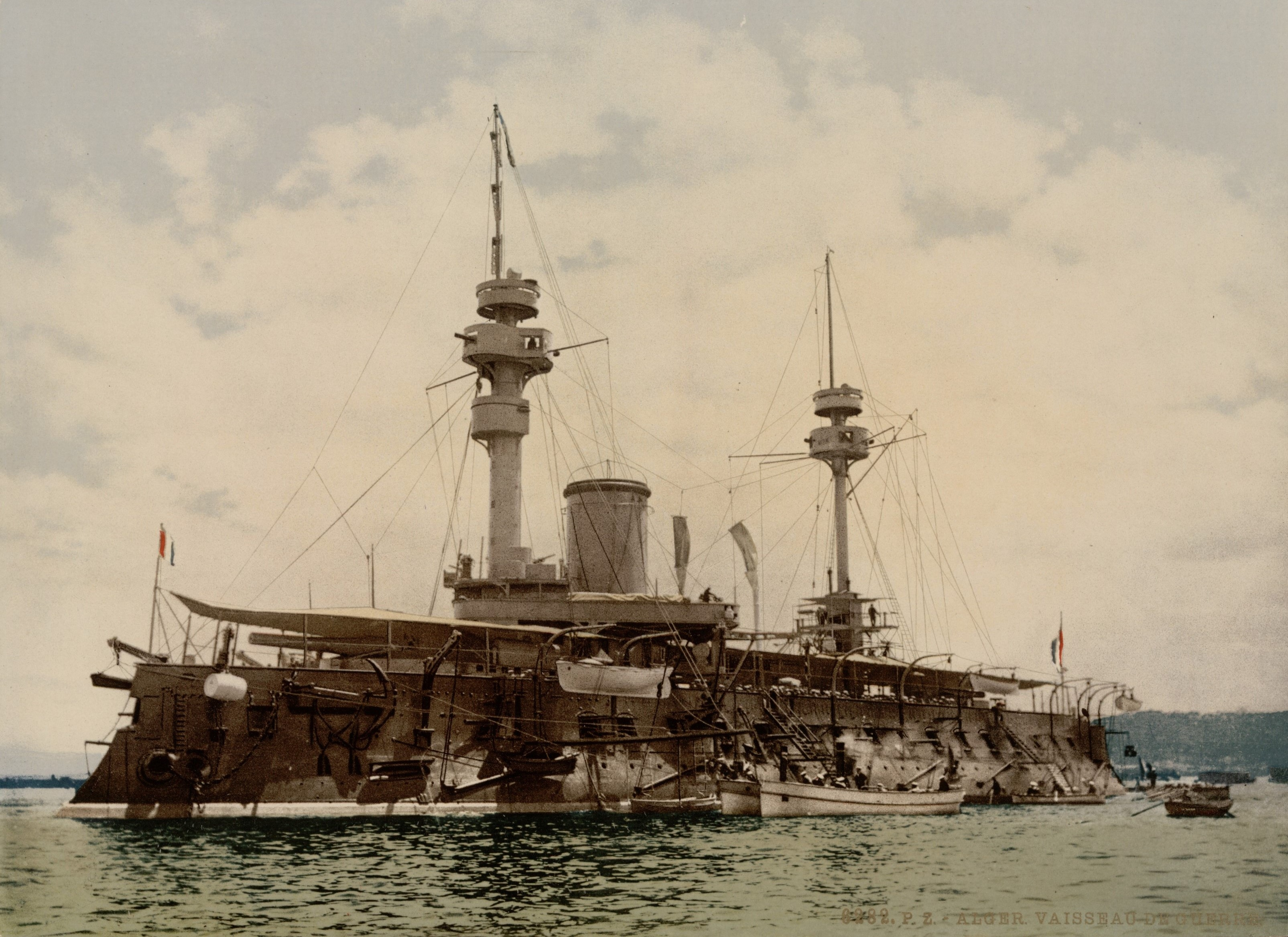
The Amiral Baudin-class ironclad Formidable; its very large 76-ton gun can be seen under the awning

In the aftermath of the Franco-Prussian War of 1870–1871, the French Navy embarked on a construction program to strengthen the fleet in 1872. By that time, the Italian Regia Marina (Royal Navy) had begun its own expansion program under the direction of Benedetto Brin, which included the construction of several very large ironclad warships of the Duilio and Italia classes, armed with 450 mm (17.7 in) 100-ton guns. The French initially viewed the ships as not worthy of concern, though by 1877, public pressure over the new Italian vessels prompted the Navy's Conseil des Travaux (Board of Construction) to design a response, beginning with the barbette ship Amiral Duperré and following with six vessels carrying 100-ton guns of French design. The first of these were the two Amiral Baudin-class ironclads, which carried their guns in open barbettes, all on the centerline, with one forward and two aft.

Problems aboard other vessels with new 76-ton guns prompted the naval command to abandon the as-yet untested 100-ton weapons. A modified version of the 76-ton gun with a longer barrel and that had been adapted to use new propellant charges was developed; these changes gave it higher muzzle velocity, which allowed its shells to penetrate as well as the 100-ton gun had been expected to perform. The Amiral Baudins were too advanced in their construction to allow their design to be revised, but the other four vessels of the program, which became Hoche and the three Marceau-class ironclads, had not yet begun building. Their design, which was prepared by the naval engineer Charles Ernest Huin, was radically altered from the Amiral Baudin arrangement to what would become the standard for future French capital ships for the next two decades. The large caliber guns were increased to four, one forward, one aft, and a wing mount on either side amidships to maximize end-on fire (which was emphasized by those who favored ramming attacks).

By the time the design for these new ships was being finalized in early 1880, very large guns had fallen out of favor in the French Navy, so new 52-ton guns were substituted. The Navy had intended to build all four vessels to the same design, but after work began on Hoche in June 1880, the shipyard realized that Huin's design was unworkable; the proposed hull dimensions were insufficient for the weight of armament to be carried. The shipyard engineers proposed widening the beam and increasing displacement to correct the problem, but Hoche was too far advanced in construction to allow the necessary changes without breaking up the existing hull structure. The other three ships, which became the Marceaus, had not been laid down and could be modified, and they retained the barbettes of the earlier ships. Since it was deemed cost prohibitive to rework Hoche's hull, other changes would have to be made. Her revised design was approved on 31 January 1881, with a slightly longer hull and a revised armament. Lighter 28-ton guns were substituted for her wing barbettes. Later, on 17 August 1882, the Navy requested that fully-armored gun turrets be used for her centerline guns; this made Hoche the first French capital ship to use armored turrets. Huin accepted this change, but the additional weight of the turrets forced the hull to be lowered by a deck to retain sufficient stability.

=== Characteristics ===
Top and profile drawing of Hoche

Hoche was 102.59 m (336 ft 7 in) long at the waterline, with a beam of 20.22 m (66 ft 4 in) and a draft of 8.31 m (27 ft 3 in). She displaced 10,820 long tons (10,990 t). The ship had a low freeboard and a very large superstructure that rendered her very top-heavy and as a result unstable. Her superstructure was so large that she was nicknamed "le Grand Hôtel". The problem was compounded by the fact that she was overweight on completion, which further reduced her freeboard. Her forward and aft conning towers included bridges that were cantilevered over the main battery turrets. The hull featured a pronounced ram bow. She was fitted with a pair of heavy military masts equipped with fighting tops that carried some of her light guns and were also used to spot for her main battery guns. Steering was controlled by a single large rudder. The crew consisted of 611 officers and enlisted men.

Her propulsion machinery consisted of two vertical compound steam engines that each drove a single screw propeller. Steam for the engines was provided by eight coal-burning fire-tube boilers that were ducted into a single wide funnel that were placed directly astern of the conning tower. Her engines were rated to produce 12,000 indicated horsepower (8,900 kW) for a top speed of 16.5 knots (30.6 km/h; 19.0 mph). Coal storage amounted to 590 to 740 long tons (600 to 750 t). Her cruising radius was 610 nautical miles (1,130 km; 700 mi), though the speed that enabled that range is unknown.

Her main armament consisted of two 340 mm (13 in) Modèle 1881 guns and 274 mm (10.8 in) Modèle 1881 guns, both of which were 28-caliber weapons. They were all mounted in individual barbette mounts, with the 340 mm guns on the centerline, forward and aft, and the 274 mm guns in wing mounts amidships. The 340 mm guns fired 350 kg (770 lb) high-explosive shells filled with melinite with a muzzle velocity of 555 m/s (1,820 ft/s). The 274 mm guns fired 216 kg (476 lb) shells at a velocity of 600 m/s (2,000 ft/s).

These guns were supported by a secondary battery of eighteen 138 mm (5.4 in) guns, all carried in individual pivot mounts. Fourteen of the guns were placed in a gun battery in the hull, seven guns per broadside, and the remaining four were located at the four corners of the superstructure. For defense against torpedo boats, she carried ten 47 mm (1.9 in) 3-pounder guns and ten 37 mm (1.5 in) 1-pounder Hotchkiss revolvers, all in individual mounts. These were placed in a variety of locations, including in the fighting tops, in a small battery directly above the wing barbettes, and elsewhere in the superstructure. Her armament was rounded out with five 380 mm (15 in) torpedo tubes in above-water mounts. Two were placed on each broadside and the last was in the stern.

Hoche was protected with compound armor; she was the first French capital ship to use the new type of armor extensively. (Note: The preceding Amiral Baudin-class ironclads received some compound armor, but only on their main battery barbettes; the rest of their armor plate was older mild steel or wrought iron.) Her armor belt covered the entire length of the hull, and the central portion that protected her vitals—the propulsion machinery spaces and ammunition magazines—was 457 mm (18 in). The central portion was 0.61 m (2 ft) above the waterline and 1.7 m (5.5 ft) below, though it tapered to 356 mm (14 in) at the bottom edge. But because of her overloaded condition, her belt was almost entirely submerged, significantly reducing its effectiveness. The bow section was 254 mm (10 in), while the stern section of the hull was 305 mm (12 in) thick. Above the belt was a strake of 81 mm (3.2 in). She had an armor deck that consisted of 79 mm (3.1 in) of wrought iron on a layer of 20 mm (0.8 in) of mild steel; the armor deck was connected to the main belt armor just below the top edge. The main battery turrets and barbettes were 406 mm (16 in) thick, while the supporting tubes that connected them to their magazines consisted of 240 mm (9 in) of wrought iron. The conning tower had 64 mm (2.5 in) sides.

=== Modifications ===
Hoche after her 1898 reconstruction

The ship was modified several times over the course of her career to correct her stability deficiencies. Six of her 138 mm guns were removed by 1895 in an effort to lighten her superstructure. In 1898, Hoche underwent a more thorough reconstruction to remedy her instability and upgrade her armament and propulsion system. Her superstructure was reduced significantly to lower her center of mass. The old compound engines were replaced with vertical triple-expansion steam engines and sixteen coal-fired, water-tube Belleville boilers were installed in place of her original fire-tube boilers. Her original 138 mm guns were removed and twelve 138 mm Modèle 1893 guns were added. Eight of these were placed in the battery, four per broadside, and the other four were placed in the upper deck mounts above the wing barbettes. Four 9-pounder guns were added to supplement the anti-torpedo boat defense. Two of her torpedo tubes were also removed. These alterations reduced her displacement to 10,580 long tons (10,750 t) at full load. The reduction in weight restored her intended waterline and kept the side armor above the water. Her cruising range was increased to 1,292 nmi (2,393 km; 1,487 mi).

== Service history ==
=== Construction – 1901 ===
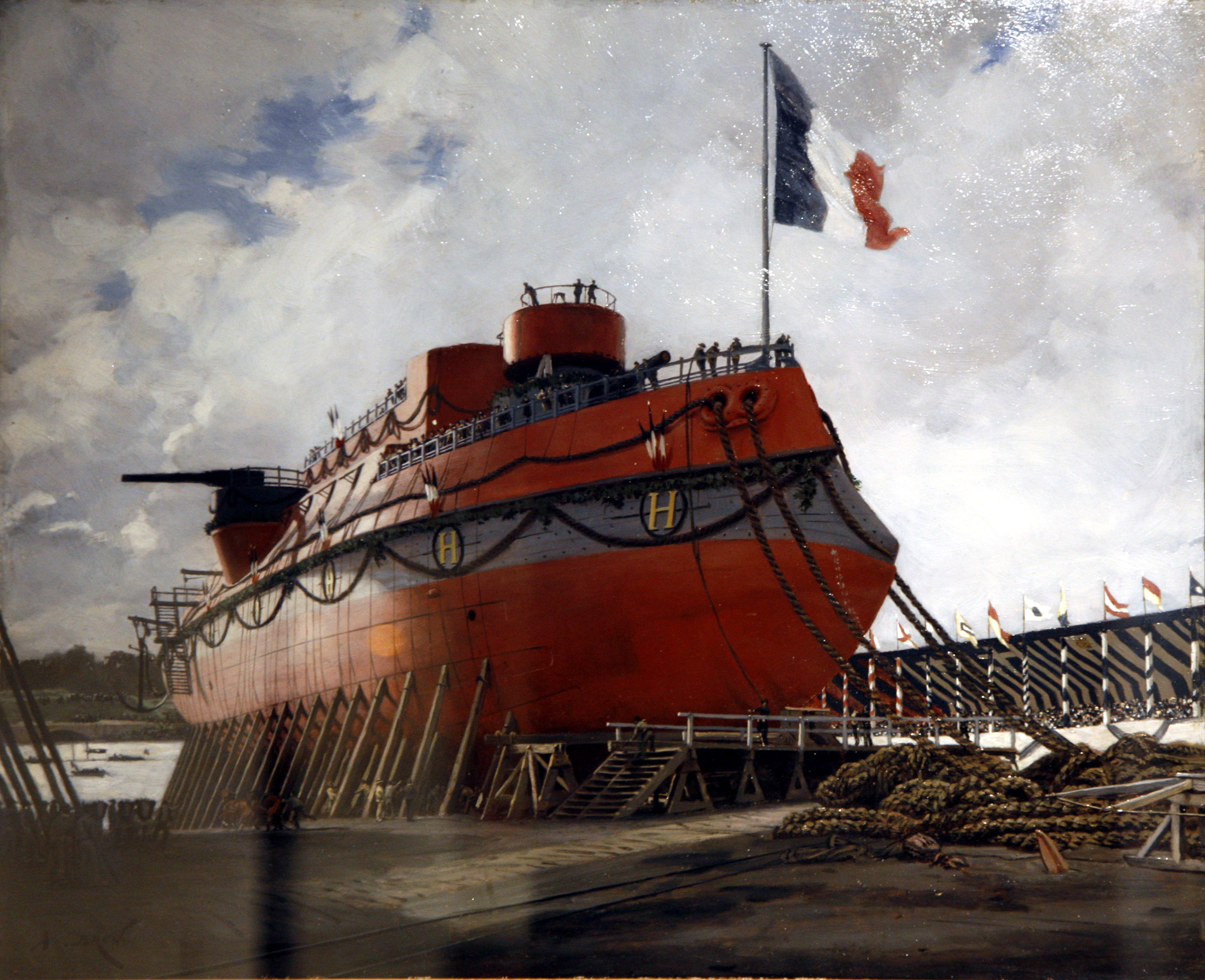
Painting of Hoche at her launching ceremony

Hoche was ordered on 3 August 1880, and her keel was laid down in August 1881 in Lorient. She was launched on 29 September 1886. Fitting-out work was completed by mid-1889; installation of her engines lasted from 15 September 1888 to 8 July 1889. She was placed in limited commission for sea trials on 15 July, though her trials crew was not fully assembled until 4 February 1890. She was moved to Brest three days later, but the start of her examination was delayed until July. Her initial inspection and working up period lasted until January 1891, and she was placed in full commission on the 12th. During the lengthy trials period, she was assigned to the Northern Squadron, based in the English Channel. She served as the flagship of the unit, at that time commanded by Admiral Alfred Gervais. She got underway on 21 February 1891 for Toulon, where she joined the Mediterranean Squadron, where she conducted sea trials. During the fleet maneuvers of 1891, which began on 23 June, Hoche was assigned to the 2nd Division, 1st Squadron along with the ironclads Redoutable and Amiral Baudin. The maneuvers lasted until 11 July. On 7 July 1892, Hoche accidentally collided with the mail steamer SS Maréchal Canrobert as the two vessels were passing through the roadstead outside Marseille, striking her with her ram amidships and nearly cutting the steamer in half. The latter's captain tied Maréchal Canrobert to Hoche to allow his passengers and crew to come aboard Hoche. After they were successfully evacuated, he cut the line connecting the ships and Maréchal Canrobert quickly foundered.

The ship remained in service with the Mediterranean Squadron in 1892, which by that time had been joined by the three Marceau-class ironclads. She participated in the 1893 maneuvers, again as part of the 2nd Division in company with the ironclad Amiral Duperré and Amiral Baudin; that year, she served as the flagship of Rear Admiral Le Bourgeois. The maneuvers included an initial period of exercises from 1 to 10 July and then larger-scale maneuvers from 17 to 28 July. Hoche was transferred back to the Northern Squadron in 1895, by which time the coastal defense ironclads Bouvines, Amiral-Tréhouart, Jemmapes, and Valmy, along with the armored cruiser Dupuy de Lôme formed the unit. That year, she and Dupuy de Lôme traveled to Kiel, Germany, to represent France at the opening ceremonies for the Kaiser Wilhelm Canal on 20 June. She remained in the Northern Squadron through the following year. During the maneuvers held in 1896, Hoche served as the flagship of Vice Admiral Rognault de Premesnil. The exercises were held from 6 to 26 July, beginning with drills for the crews and concluding with a simulated battle between a squadron led by Hoche against an "enemy" unit that was to raid the French coast and escape, which it succeeded in doing.

Hoche again participated in the large-scale maneuvers of 1897, which were held in July. Hoche and the bulk of the squadron were tasked with intercepting Bouvines, which was to steam from Cherbourg to Brest between 15 and 16 July. As with the previous year's maneuvers, the defending squadron was unable to intercept Bouvines before she reached Brest. The squadron then moved to Quiberon Bay for another round of maneuvers from 18 to 21 July. This scenario saw the protected cruisers Sfax and Tage simulate a hostile fleet steaming from the Mediterranean Sea to attack France's Atlantic coast. Unlike previous exercises, Hoche and the rest of the Northern Squadron successfully intercepted the cruisers and "defeated" them. In early 1898, Hoche struck an uncharted rock in Quiberon Bay, which caused extensive damage to her hull. Because of the significant repair work, the navy decided to place the ship in reserve and modernize her boilers, which had already been authorized in the 1898 budget, but had not yet been scheduled. As a result, her place in the squadron was taken by the new pre-dreadnought battleship Masséna, which had entered service in June 1898. Repairs were completed at Brest by August, after which Hoche moved to Cherbourg to have her new boilers installed, along with other modifications. Work was completed by August 1901, when Hoche conducted sea trials before returning to service.

=== 1901–1913 ===
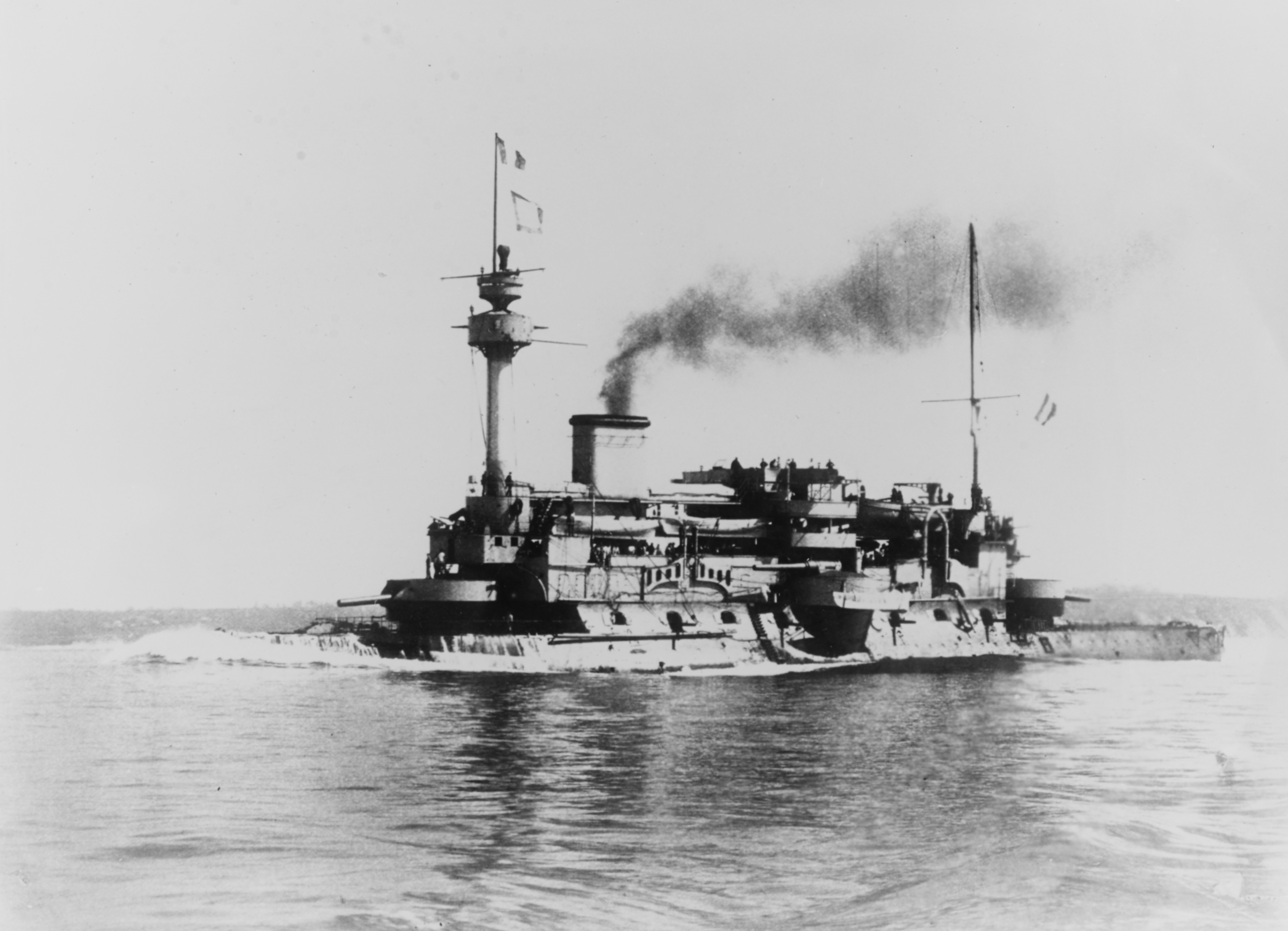
Hoche after her initial 1895 refit

After returning to active duty in 1901, Hoche once again joined the Northern Squadron. By that time, the squadron also included Masséna, the pre-dreadnought Carnot, and the ironclads Amiral Baudin, Formidable, and Courbet. During the fleet maneuvers that year, the Northern Squadron steamed south for joint maneuvers with the Mediterranean Squadron. The Northern Squadron ships formed part of the hostile force, and as it was entering the Mediterranean from the Atlantic, represented a German squadron attempting to meet its Italian allies. The exercises began on 3 July and concluded on 28 July. In August and September, the Northern Squadron conducted amphibious assault exercises. On 28 August, they escorted a group of troop ships from Brest to La Rochelle. The ships conducted a simulated bombardment of the port, neutralized the coastal defenses, and put some 6,000 men ashore. The next year, Hoche, Carnot, and Amiral Baudin were transferred to the Reserve Division in the Mediterranean Squadron. The ships in the Reserve Division were kept in a state of readiness with reduced crews that could be completed with naval reservists for the annual fleet exercises (or in the event of war). Hoche and the rest of the Reserve Division participated in the 1902 fleet maneuvers, which occurred in three phases. The first lasted from 7 to 10 July, the second from 15 to 24 July, and the third from 28 July to 4 August.

She remained in the unit through 1903, which by then included Carnot and the pre-dreadnoughts Brennus and Charles Martel. With several new battleships entering serving in 1903 and 1904, Hoche was reduced to 2nd category reserve in 1904. She returned to the Reserve Division in 1905, and remained there through the following year. She took part in the fleet maneuvers that year, which began on 6 July with the concentration of the Northern and Mediterranean Squadrons in Algiers. The maneuvers were conducted in the western Mediterranean, alternating between ports in French North Africa and Toulon and Marseille, France, and concluding on 4 August. She was present for a major naval review held off Marseille on 16 September that included British, Spanish, and Italian vessels. The ship was thereafter reduced to the 2nd category reserve. She was reactivated for service in the Reserve Division later that year, taking part in the fleet maneuvers in July. She remained in the unit in 1908 along with four pre-dreadnoughts. Hoche was ultimately expended as a target ship and, while towed at 6 knots by the cruiser Jules Michelet, she was sunk on 2 December 1913 south of Toulon by practice fire from the pre-dreadnought Jauréguiberry and the cruiser Pothuau, both equipped with experimental fire-control systems developed by Yves Le Prieur.
