= René-Julien Marquis =

French naval officer

- Born: 28 March 1846; Rochefort, France
- Died: 24 November 1924 (aged 78); Nice, France
- Military career
- Allegiance: France
- Branch: French Navy
- Service years: 1865–1911
- Rank: vice-amiral

René-Julien Marquis (28 March 1846 – 24 November 1928) was a French naval officer who was the father of André Marquis. He served as the préfet maritime of Rochefort, Charente-Maritime and Toulon

== Early life ==
Son of a notary, he entered the École Navale (Naval School) in October 1862 and graduated as an aspirant 1st class in October 1865. He then served in the Pacific Naval Division on the Venus and took part in the landing of Mazatlán in Mexico.

Promoted ensign in October 1867, he embarked in Toulon on the transports Var and Marne before being sent to the rifle battalion in April 1870. He then stood out during the Siege of Paris. Thanks to his conduct at the Fort de Rosny and the battles of the Avron plateau, he was promoted to lieutenant for warships in December 1870.

In February 1872, he served on the ironclad Atalante in the Pacific Division then did the School of Gunnery in Toulon on the training ship-of-the-line Alexandre and on the Souverain (1876) before being appointed officer of the maritime prefect of Toulon Marie Jules Dupré in June 1877. In January 1879, he embarked on the ironclad Colbert as a firing squadron officer of evolutions and became in May 1881, maneuver officer on the Intrepid. He then participated in the Bombardment of Sfax, Tunisia, then served on Colbert and the ironclad Marengo (1881–1882) before being appointed commander of the Avis Bruat at the station in New Caledonia where he worked on hydrography surveys to prepare the laying of a telegraph cable to Australia. This work brings him in December 1884 a testimony of satisfaction.

Commander (July 1885), he became, second of Colbert in October 1886 in evolution squadron and served in 1887 to the majority in Toulon. In 1888, he commanded the aviso Inconstant then went second to the cruiser La Clochetterie in Newfoundland (1889) before ordering the transport Indre there.

Captain (February 1891), major general at Rochefort, he became June 1892 assistant to the general inspectors of the navy. He then commanded the ironclad Devastation.

Deputy Chief of Staff in Toulon (June 1893), commander of the ironclad Suffren, he obtained in April 1894 a testimony of satisfaction for the quality of his instruction given to gabiers. In June 1895, he commanded the ironclad Marceau in the Mediterranean squadron and again deserved congratulations for having failed the ironclad Formidable (December 1895).

Major of the navy in Toulon (October 1897), he commanded in July 1898 the unprotected cruiser Duguay-Trouin at the Far East squadron and became superior commander at Kouang-Tchéou-Wan newly sold by China to France.

Major General at Rochefort (May 1899), Rear Admiral (July 1899), he commanded the 2nd division of the Mediterranean squadron on the pre-dreadnought battleship Charles Martel (October 1901) then on the pre-dreadnougth Iéna before being promoted to vice-admiral in October 1903.

Maritime prefect of Rochefort in December 1903, he became maritime prefect of Toulon in September 1905 and retired in March 1911.

Himself a painter and musician, Marquis is noted for having encouraged the young Charles Millot, alias H. Gervèse, later the Peintre de la Marine (Artist of the Navy).

== Awards and distinctions ==
- Knight (July 1876), Officer (3 May 1889), Commander (5 April 1903) then Grand Officer of the Legion of Honor (31 December 1908)
- Commander with plaque of the Order of Médjidié
- Commander of the Order of the Savior of Greece

== Bibliography ==
- Taillemite, Etienne (1982). Dictionnaire des marins français. Paris: Editions maritimes et d'Outre-Mer. OCLC 470113586.
