= French battleship Carnot =

French pre-dreadnought battleship

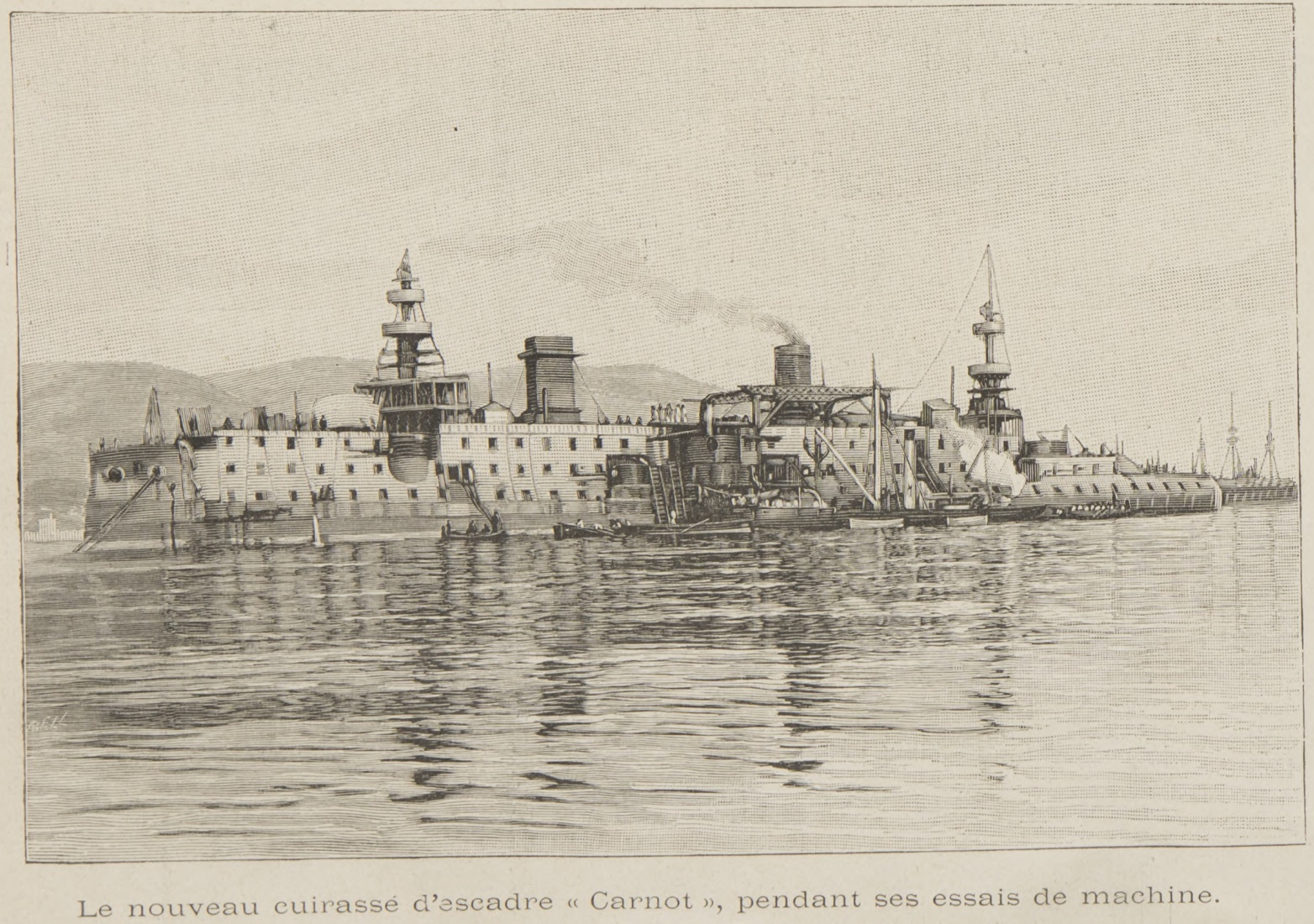
- Illustration of Carnot fitting out, c. 1896

Class overview
- Preceded by: Charles Martel
- Succeeded by: Jauréguiberry

History

France
- Name: Carnot
- Namesake: Lazare Carnot and Marie François Sadi Carnot
- Builder: Arsenal de Toulon
- Laid down: July 1891
- Launched: July 1894
- Commissioned: July 1897
- Fate: Broken up in 1922

General characteristics
- Type: Pre-dreadnought battleship
- Displacement: 11,954 t (11,765 long tons; 13,177 short tons)
- Length: 114 m (374 ft)
- Beam: 21.4 m (70 ft)
- Draft: 8.36 m (27.4 ft)
- Propulsion: 2-shaft triple expansion engines; 24 boilers; 16,300 ihp (12,200 kW)
- Speed: 17.8 knots (33.0 km/h; 20.5 mph)
- Complement: 647
- Armament: 2 × 1 305mm/45 Modèle 1887 guns; 2 × 1 274mm/45 Modèle 1887 guns; 8 × 1 138mm/45 Modèle 1888 guns; 2 × 450 mm (18 in) torpedo tubes (submerged)
- Armor: Belt: 460 mm (18 in); Conning tower: 230 mm (9.1 in); Turrets: 380 mm (15 in)

Carnot (Note: English: /kɑːrˈnoʊ/ kar-NOH, French: [kaʁno]) was a pre-dreadnought battleship of the French Navy. She was laid down in July 1891, launched in July 1894, and completed in July 1897. She was a member of a group of five broadly similar battleships, along with Charles Martel, Jauréguiberry, Bouvet, and Masséna, which were ordered in response to the British Royal Sovereign class. Like her half-sisters, she was armed with a main battery of two 305 mm (12 in) guns and two 274 mm (10.8 in) guns in individual turrets. She had a top speed of 17.8 knots (33.0 km/h; 20.5 mph).

Carnot had a fairly uneventful career. She spent the majority of her service life in the Northern and Mediterranean Squadrons of the French fleet, where she participated in extensive, annual maneuvers. She was withdrawn from service by the outbreak of World War I in August 1914, and so did not see action during the conflict. She remained in the French Navy's inventory until 1922, when she was stricken from the naval register and sold for scrap.

== Design ==
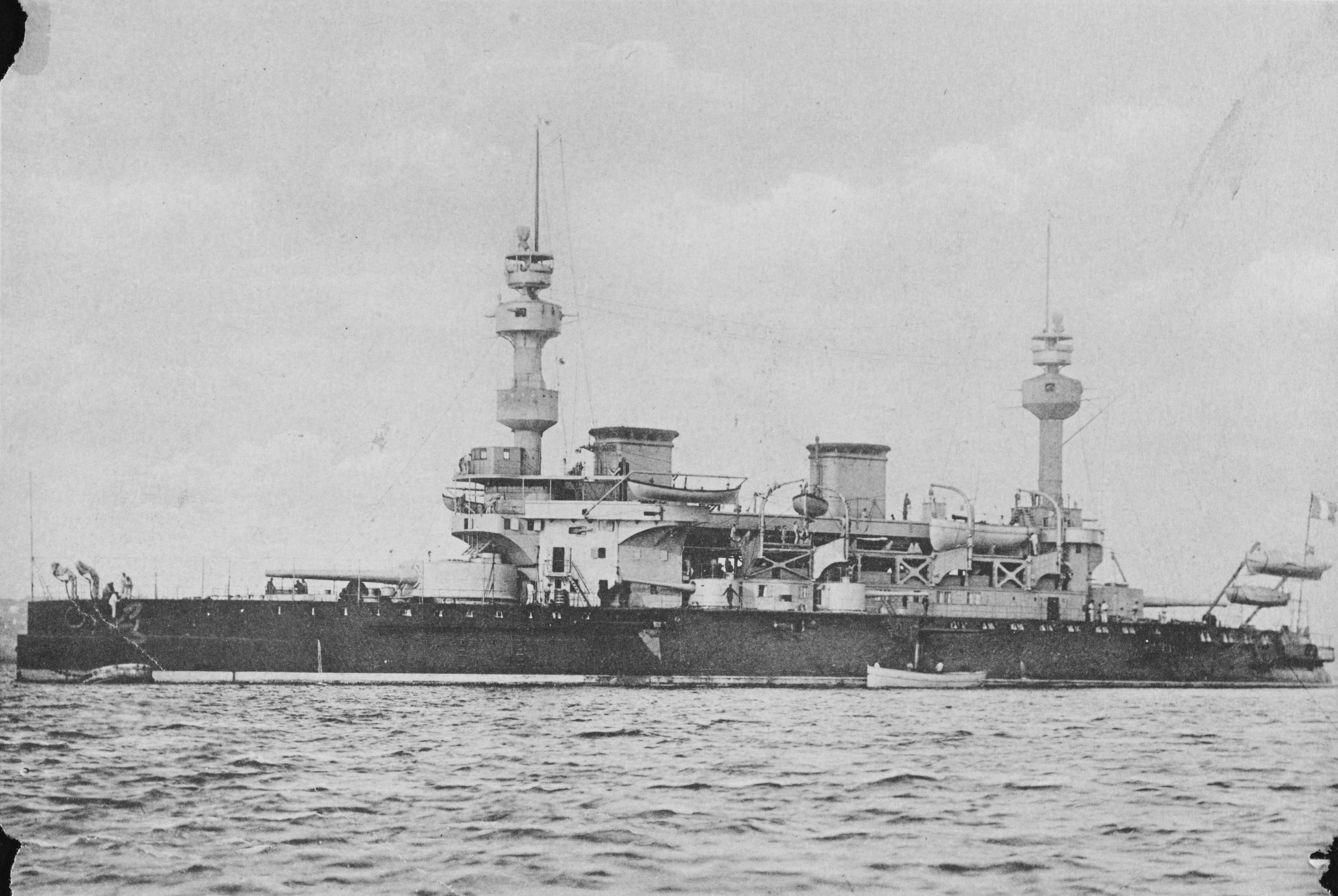
Brennus, which formed the basis for Carnot's design

In 1889, the British Royal Navy passed the Naval Defence Act that resulted in the construction of the eight Royal Sovereign-class battleships; this major expansion of naval power led the French government to pass its reply, the Statut Naval (Naval Law) of 1890. The law called for a total of twenty-four "cuirasses d'escadre" (squadron battleships) and a host of other vessels, including coastal defense battleships, cruisers, and torpedo boats. The first stage of the program was to be a group of four squadron battleships that were built to different designs but met the same basic characteristics, including armor, armament, and displacement. The naval high command issued the basic requirements on 24 December 1889; displacement would not exceed 14,000 metric tons (14,000 long tons; 15,000 short tons), the primary armament was to consist of 34-centimeter (13 in) and 27 cm (11 in) guns, the belt armor should be 45 cm (18 in), and the ships should maintain a top speed of 17 knots (31 km/h; 20 mph). The secondary battery was to be either 14 cm (5.5 in) or 16 cm (6.3 in) caliber, with as many guns fitted as space would allow.

The basic design for the ships was based on the previous battleship Brennus, but instead of mounting the main battery all on the centerline, the ships used the lozenge arrangement of the earlier vessel Magenta, which moved two of the main battery guns to single turrets on the wings. Although the navy had stipulated that displacement could be up to 14,000 tons, political considerations, namely parliamentary objections to increases in naval expenditures, led the designers to limit displacement to around 12,000 metric tons (12,000 long tons; 13,000 short tons). Five naval architects submitted proposals to the competition; the design for Carnot was prepared by Victor Saglio, the Sous-directeur des constructions navales (Under-director of Naval Construction) at Toulon. The navy accepted Saglio's proposal and ordered the ship on 10 September 1891. Though the program called for four ships to be built in the first year, five were ultimately ordered: Carnot, Charles Martel, Jauréguiberry, Bouvet, and Masséna.

She and her half-sisters were disappointments in service; they generally suffered from stability problems, and Louis-Émile Bertin, the Director of Naval Construction in the late 1890s, referred to the ships as "chavirables" (prone to capsizing). All five of the vessels compared poorly to their British counterparts, particularly their contemporaries of the Majestic class. The ships suffered from a lack of uniformity of equipment, which made them hard to maintain in service, and their mixed gun batteries comprising several calibers made gunnery in combat conditions difficult, since shell splashes were hard to differentiate. Many of the problems that plagued the ships in service were a result of the limitation on their displacement, particularly their stability and seakeeping.

=== General characteristics and machinery ===
Line drawing of Carnot

Carnot was 114 meters (374 ft 0 in) long between perpendiculars, and had a beam of 21.4 m (70 ft 3 in) and a draft of 8.36 m (27 ft 5 in). She had a displacement of 11,954 tonnes (11,765 long tons). Her forecastle gave her a high freeboard forward, but her quarterdeck was cut down to the main deck level aft. Her hull was given a marked tumblehome to give the 27 cm guns wide fields of fire. The ship was equipped with a heavy military foremast and a lighter pole mainmast.

Her bridge and other superstructure was smaller compared to Charles Martel to reduce topweight, and she was equipped with lighter pole masts instead of the heavy fighting masts used on her half-sister. She nevertheless suffered from the same stability problems that plagued Charles Martel and many other French capital ships of the period; attempts were made to reduce her topweight by cutting down the bridge and replacing her military mast with another pole mast, but these changes were not successful. In addition, Carnot was completed with a very large number of portholes in her hull, which were criticized for the reduction in the hull's watertight integrity they imposed. Later in the ship's career, many of the portholes were sealed to reduce the risk of flooding. Carnot had a crew of 647 officers and enlisted men.

Carnot had two vertical, three-cylinder triple expansion engines manufactured by Schneider-Creusot; each engine drove a single screw, with steam supplied by twenty-four Lagrafel d'Allest water-tube boilers. The boilers were divided into four boiler rooms and were ducted into two funnels. Her propulsion system was rated at 16,300 indicated horsepower (12,200 kW), which allowed the ship to steam at a speed of 17.8 knots (33.0 km/h; 20.5 mph) with forced draft. As built, she could carry 680 t (670 long tons; 750 short tons) of coal, though additional space allowed for up to 980 t (960 long tons; 1,080 short tons) in total.

=== Armament and armor ===
Carnot's main armament consisted of two Canon de 305 mm Modèle 1887 guns in two single-gun turrets, one each fore and aft. She also mounted two Canon de 274 mm Modèle 1887 guns in two single-gun turrets, one amidships on each side, sponsoned out over the tumblehome of the ship's sides. Her secondary armament consisted of eight Canon de 138.6 mm Modèle 1888 guns, which were mounted in single turrets at the corners of the superstructure.

Light armament for defense against torpedo boats consisted of eight Canon de 65 mm Modèle 1891 quick-firing guns on the shelter deck amidships and forward and aft of the superstructure, twelve 47 mm Modèle 1885 quick-firing guns, and eight 37 mm revolving cannon. Her armament suite was rounded out by four 450 mm (18 in) torpedo tubes, two of which were submerged in the ship's hull, with the other two in trainable deck mounts.

The ship's armor was constructed with nickel steel that was manufactured by Schneider-Creusot. The main belt was 46 cm (18 in) thick amidships where it protected the ammunition magazines and propulsion machinery spaces, and tapered down to 25 cm (9.8 in) at the lower edge. On either end of the central citadel, the belt was reduced to 30.5 cm (12.0 in) at the waterline and 25 cm on the lower edge; the belt extended for the entire length of the hull. Above the belt was a 12 cm (4.7 in) thick strake side armor that created a highly subdivided cofferdam to reduce the risk of flooding from battle damage. Coal storage bunkers were placed behind the upper side armor to increase its strength

The main battery guns were protected with 38 cm (15 in) of armor, and the secondary turrets had 10 cm thick sides. The main armored deck was 9 cm (3.5 in) thick, below which was a splinter deck that was 2 cm (0.79 in) thick, intended to catch shell fragments that penetrated the main deck. The conning tower had 23 cm (9.1 in) thick sides.

== History ==
Carnot sometime before 1905

Carnot was laid down in Toulon in 1891 and launched three years later on 12 July 1894, originally under the name Lazare-Carnot after Lazare Carnot. Fitting-out work was completed another two years after that and the ship began sea trials in 1896. After completing those, the ship was commissioned into the fleet in July 1897. By that time, her name had been shortened to Carnot, to honor her original namesake as well as his grandson Marie François Sadi Carnot, who had been President of France until his assassination on 25 June 1894. Immediately on entering service, she and her half-sisters Charles Martel and Jauréguiberry were sent to join the International Squadron that had been assembled beginning in February. The multinational force also included ships of the Austro-Hungarian Navy, the Imperial German Navy, the Italian Regia Marina, the Imperial Russian Navy, and the British Royal Navy, and it was sent to intervene in the 1897–1898 Greek uprising on Crete against rule by the Ottoman Empire.

Carnot spent the majority of her active career alternating between the Northern and Mediterranean Squadrons. The newer battleships typically served in the Mediterranean, while older vessels were assigned to the Northern Squadron. In January 1900, she was assigned to the Northern Squadron, under the command of Vice Admiral Ménard, replacing Charlemagne. In July, she and the other Northern Squadron ships met with the Mediterranean Squadron off the coast of Portugal and then steamed to Quiberon Bay for joint training exercises. The maneuvers concluded with a naval review in Cherbourg on 19 July for President Émile Loubet. By 1902, Carnot had been transferred to the Reserve Squadron of the Mediterranean Squadron, along with the battleships Brennus, Charles Martel, and Hoche and the three armored cruisers Pothuau, Amiral Charner, and Bruix. The Reserve Squadron was commanded by Rear Admiral Besson, who flew his flag in Brennus. The entire French fleet, including Carnot, conducted extensive maneuvers in the Mediterranean in July and August of that year.

Carnot and Bouvet were transferred back to the Northern Squadron in 1904. Carnot was still serving with the Northern Squadron in 1906, when she participated in the annual summer maneuvers in June–July that year. The following year, Carnot was back in the Mediterranean in the Second Squadron. She remained in the Second Squadron through 1911. On 5 January 1911, Carnot and rest of the Second Squadron was transferred to Brest. Later that year, as the Danton-class battleships began to enter service, the ships of the Second Squadron became the new Third Squadron as the Dantons displaced the ships of the First Squadron to the Second Squadron, which was transferred back to Toulon. During this period, on 4 September 1911, the three squadrons of the French fleet held a naval review off Toulon. On 11 January 1913, Carnot was reduced to reserve.

In early 1914, the French Naval Minister Ernest Monis decided to discard Carnot, owing to the cost of maintaining the obsolete battleship, which was by then nearly twenty years old. By the outbreak of World War I in August 1914, Carnot had been laid up in the port of Brest, along with Charles Martel. Both ships were retained on the effective list, however, pending the completion of the new Normandie-class battleships. Carnot was ultimately stricken from the naval register in 1922 and sold for scrapping that year.
