= French battleship Masséna =

French Navy's pre-dreadnought battleship

- Masséna

Class overview
- Preceded by: Jauréguiberry
- Succeeded by: Bouvet

History

France
- Name: Masséna
- Namesake: André Masséna
- Builder: Ateliers et Chantiers de la Loire
- Laid down: September 1892
- Launched: July 1895
- Commissioned: June 1898
- Fate: Scuttled 9 November 1915

General characteristics
- Type: Pre-dreadnought battleship
- Displacement: 11,735 tonnes (11,550 long tons)
- Length: 112.65 m (369 ft 7 in)
- Beam: 20.27 m (66 ft 6 in)
- Draught: 8.84 m (29 ft 0 in)
- Propulsion: 3 triple expansion engines
- Speed: 17 kn (31 km/h; 20 mph)
- Complement: 667
- Armament: 2 × 305 mm/45 (12 in) Modèle 1893 guns; 2 × 274 mm/45 (10.8 in) Modèle 1893 guns; 8 × 138 mm/45 (5.5 in) Modèle 1891 guns; 8 × 100 mm (3.9 in) guns; 4 × 450 mm torpedo tubes (submerged)
- Armour: Belt: 450 mm (18 in); Turrets: 400 mm (16 in); Conning tower: 350 mm (14 in)

Masséna was a pre-dreadnought battleship of the French Navy, built in the 1890s. She was a member of a group of five broadly similar battleships, along with Charles Martel, Jauréguiberry, Bouvet, and Carnot, that were ordered in response to the British Royal Sovereign class. She was named in honour of Marshal of France André Masséna. Masséna significantly exceeded her design weight and suffered from serious stability problems that inhibited accurate firing of her guns; as a result, she was considered to be an unsuccessful design.

Masséna served in both the Northern and Mediterranean Squadrons during her career, which included a period as the flagship of the Northern Squadron. She was withdrawn from service before the outbreak of World War I in 1914. The following year, she was hulked at Toulon. She was later towed to Cape Helles at the end of the Gallipoli peninsula where on 9 November 1915 she was scuttled to create a breakwater to protect the evacuation of the Allied expeditionary force withdrawing from the Gallipoli Campaign.

== Design ==
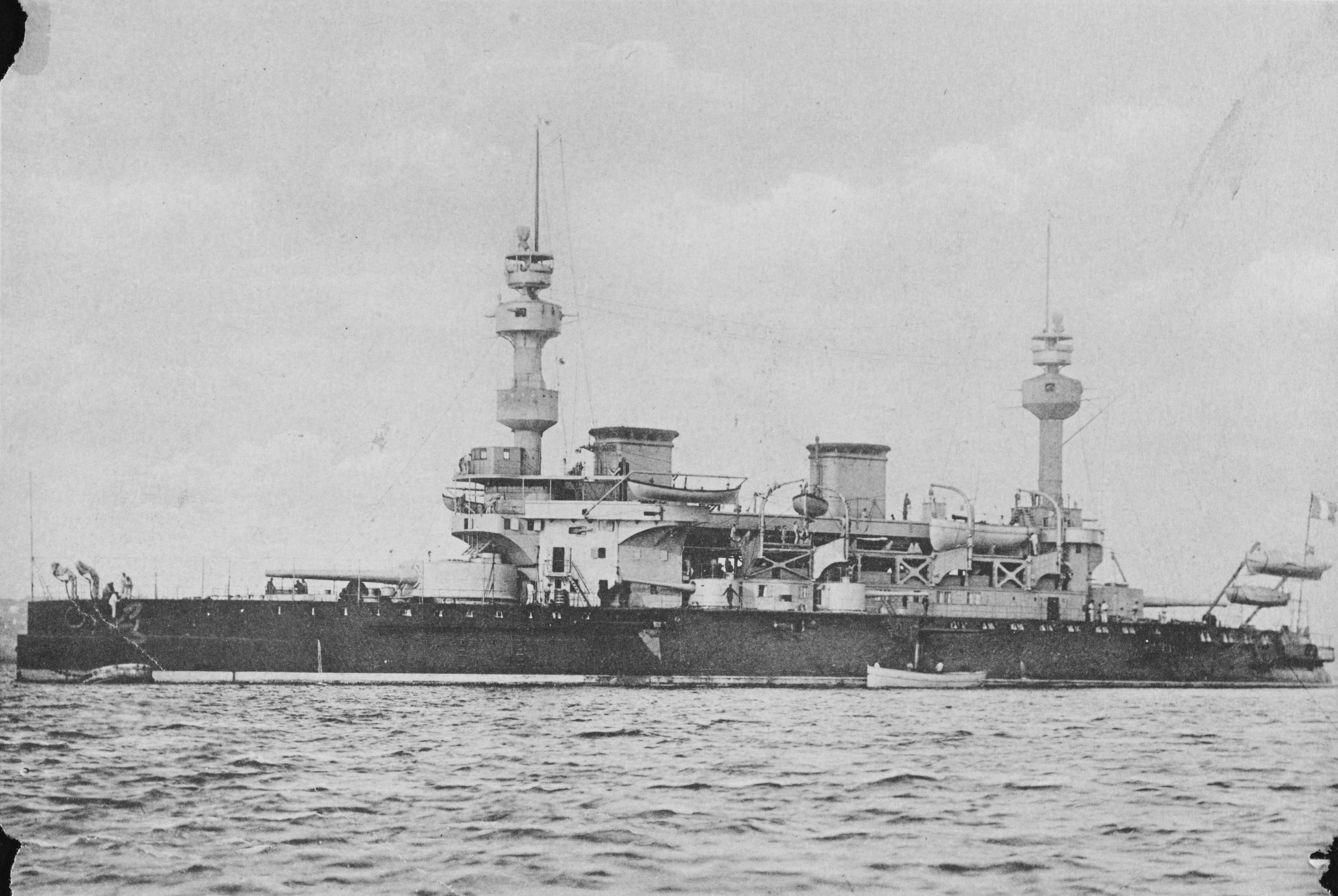
Brennus, which formed the basis for Masséna's design

In 1889, the British Royal Navy passed the Naval Defence Act that resulted in the construction of the eight Royal Sovereign-class battleships; this major expansion of naval power led the French government to pass its reply, the Statut Naval (Naval Law) of 1890. The law called for a total of twenty-four "cuirasses d'escadre" (squadron battleships) and a host of other vessels, including coastal defence battleships, cruisers, and torpedo boats. The first stage of the program was to be a group of four squadron battleships that were built to different designs but met the same basic characteristics, including armour, armament, and displacement. The naval high command issued the basic requirements on 24 December 1889; displacement would not exceed 14,000 tonnes (14,000 long tons; 15,000 short tons), the primary armament was to consist of 34-centimetre (13 in) and 27 cm (11 in) guns, the belt armour should be 45 cm (18 in), and the ships should maintain a top speed of 17 knots (31 km/h; 20 mph). The secondary battery was to be either 14 cm (5.5 in) or 16 cm (6.3 in) caliber, with as many guns fitted as space would allow.

The basic design for the ships was based on the previous battleship Brennus, but instead of mounting the main battery all on the centerline, the ships used the lozenge arrangement of the earlier vessel Magenta, which moved two of the main battery guns to single turrets on the wings. Although the navy had stipulated that displacement could be up to 14,000 tons, political considerations, namely parliamentary objections to increases in naval expenditures, led the designers to limit displacement to around 12,000 tonnes (12,000 long tons; 13,000 short tons). Five naval architects submitted proposals to the competition; the design for Masséna was prepared by Louis de Bussy, the Inspector General of Naval Construction, who had previously designed the ironclad battleship Redoutable and the armoured cruiser Dupuy de Lôme. Though the program called for four ships to be built in the first year, five were ultimately ordered: Masséna, Charles Martel, Jauréguiberry, Carnot, and Bouvet.

Masséna introduced the three-shaft arrangement for battleship propulsion systems; all previous capital ships used two steam engines. This would be the standard for all French pre-dreadnought type battleships until the Danton class begun in 1907. She and her half-sisters nevertheless were disappointments in service; they generally suffered from stability problems, and Louis-Émile Bertin, the Director of Naval Construction in the late 1890s, referred to the ships as "chavirables" (prone to capsizing). All five of the vessels compared poorly to their British counterparts, particularly their contemporaries of the Majestic class. The ships suffered from a lack of uniformity of equipment, which made them hard to maintain in service, and their mixed gun batteries comprising several calibers made gunnery in combat conditions difficult, since shell splashes were hard to differentiate. Many of the problems that plagued the ships in service were a result of the limitation on their displacement, particularly their stability and seakeeping.

=== General characteristics and machinery ===
Plan and profile drawing of Masséna

Masséna was 112.65 metres (369 ft 7 in) long between perpendiculars, and had a beam of 20.27 m (66 ft 6 in) and a draught of 8.84 m (29 ft 0 in). She was designed to displace 10,835 long tons (11,009 t) at normal load, but she was significantly overweight when completed, and she displaced 11,735 long tons (11,920 t). This caused the ship to sit lower in the water than intended, which partially submerged her armoured belt, and in less favorable conditions, the belt was submerged completely. She was built with a pronounced snout bow to improve her buoyancy, which distinguished her from her half-sisters. Also unlike most of her half-sisters, she had a relatively minimal superstructure, which avoided the top-heaviness that plagued the other ships. Her forecastle deck was cut down to the main deck aft. The ship was fitted with two heavy military masts with fighting tops. She had a crew of 667 officers and enlisted men.

Masséna had three vertical triple expansion engines each driving a single screw, with steam supplied by twenty-four Lagrafel d'Allest water-tube boilers. The boilers were ducted into a pair of widely spaced funnels. Her propulsion system was rated at 14,200 metric horsepower (14,000 ihp), which allowed the ship to steam at a speed of 17 knots (31 km/h; 20 mph); this was a knot slower than her design speed of 18 kn (33 km/h; 21 mph). Her failure to reach her designed speed was largely a result of the fact that she was significantly overweight. With only two-thirds of her boilers operating for more economic cruising, these figures fell to 9,780 metric horsepower (9,650 ihp) and 15.49 kn (28.69 km/h; 17.83 mph), respectively. As built, she could carry 650 t (640 long tons; 720 short tons) of coal, though additional space allowed for up to 800 t (790 long tons; 880 short tons) in total.

=== Armament and armour ===
Masséna early in her career

Masséna's main armament consisted of two Canon de 305 mm Modèle 1893 guns in two single-gun turrets, one each fore and aft. Each turret had an arc of fire of 250°. The placement of the forward gun turret close to the bow placed a great deal of weight too far forward. This exacerbated stability problems with the ship, and rendered accurate shooting more difficult. She also mounted two Canon de 274 mm Modèle 1893 guns in two single-gun turrets, one amidships on each side, sponsoned out over the tumblehome of the ship's sides. The 305 mm guns were an experimental 45 caliber version and had a muzzle velocity of 800 metres per second (2,625 ft/s), which produced a muzzle energy of 30,750 foot-tons and allowed the shells to penetrate up to 610 mm (24 in) of iron armour at a range of 1,800 m (2,000 yd). This was sufficiently powerful to allow Masséna's main guns to easily penetrate the armour of most contemporary battleships. The 274 mm guns, which were 45 calibers long, had a similar muzzle velocity, but being significantly smaller than the 305 mm guns, produced a muzzle energy of 22,750 foot-tons and 460 millimetres (18 in) of iron penetration.

Her secondary armament consisted of eight Canon de 138.6 mm Modèle 1891 guns, which were mounted in manually operated single turrets at the corners of the superstructure with 160° arcs of fire. For defence against torpedo boats, Masséna carried eight 100 mm (3.9 in) quick-firing guns, twelve 3-pounder quick-firers, and eight 1-pounder guns. Her armament suite was rounded out by four 450 mm (18 in) torpedo tubes, two of which were submerged in the ship's hull, the other two in trainable deck launchers.

The ship's armour was constructed with Harvey steel manufactured by Schneider-Creusot. The main belt was 250 to 450 mm (9.8 to 17.7 in) thick, and ran for a length of 110 m (360 ft) along the hull. The belt terminated some 10 m (33 ft) from the stern, where it was capped with a transverse bulkhead that was 250 mm (9.8 in). The belt was 2.3 m (7 ft 7 in) wide. Above the belt was 101 mm (4.0 in) thick side armour. The bulkheads at either end of the armoured belt were 240 mm (9.4 in) thick. The main battery guns were protected with 350 to 400 mm (14 to 16 in) of armour, and the secondary turrets had 99 mm (3.9 in) thick sides. The main armoured deck was 69 mm (2.7 in) thick, and the splinter deck below it was 38 mm (1.5 in) thick. The conning tower had 350 mm (14 in) thick sides.

== Service ==
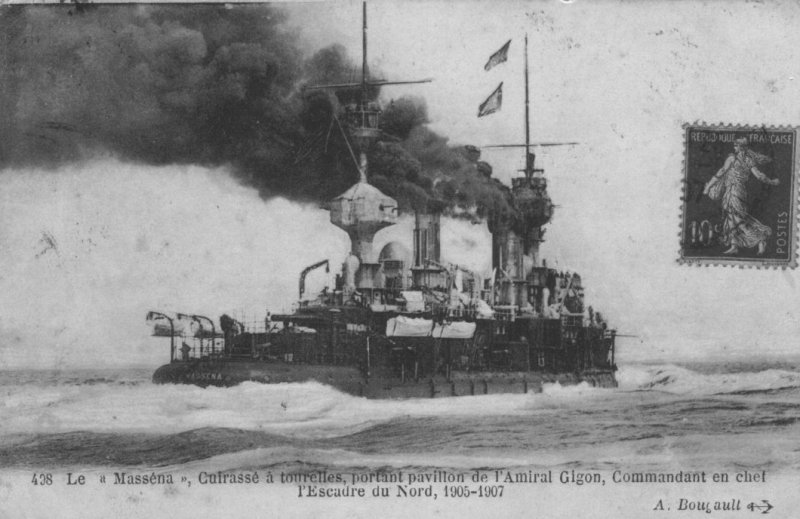
A postcard showing Masséna at sea

Masséna was laid down at the Ateliers et Chantiers de la Loire shipyard in September 1892 and launched nearly three years later on 24 July 1895. She was completed in June 1898 and entered service with the French fleet. Throughout the ship's peacetime career, she was occupied with routine training exercises that included gunnery training, combined maneuvers with torpedo boats and submarines, and practicing attacking coastal fortifications. The ship was commissioned in time for the Northern Squadron maneuvers conducted in July 1898. She was assigned as the flagship of the Northern Squadron and flew the flag of Vice Admiral Ménard. The Northern Squadron conducted annual training exercises in June; the following month, they joined the Mediterranean Squadron for combined fleet maneuvers.

In 1900, four engineering officers were seriously injured while disassembling a pipe to repair it. They had disassembled it too quickly, and were severely scalded by escaping steam. In June and July that year, she participated in extensive joint maneuvers conducted with the Mediterranean Squadron; she was still Ménard's flagship during this period. The Northern Squadron initially held its own maneuvers in Brest, which included a simulated blockade of the squadron in Brest, after which the squadron made mock attacks on the island of Belle Île and nearby Quiberon. In early July, the squadron met the Mediterranean Squadron off Lisbon, Portugal before the two units steamed north to Quiberon Bay and entered Brest on 9 July. Masséna and the rest of the Northern Squadron were tasked with attacking Cherbourg two days later. The maneuvers concluded with a naval review in Cherbourg on 19 July for President Émile Loubet.

In 1903, the ship was transferred from the Northern Squadron to the Mediterranean, where she was assigned to the Division de réserve (Reserve Division) along with her four half-sisters and the old battleship Brennus. On 18 August, the ship participated in a gunnery trial with the new battleship Suffren off Île Longue. A mild steel plate 55 centimetres (21.7 in) thick, measuring 225 by 95 centimetres (7 ft 5 in by 3 ft 1 in), was attached to the side of Suffren's forward turret to determine the resistance of an armour plate to a large-calibre shell. Masséna anchored 100 metres (330 ft) away from Suffren and fired a number of 305-millimetre (12 in) shells at the plate. The first three were training shells that knocked splinters off the armour plate. The last two shells, fired with full charges, cracked the plate, but Suffren's turret was fully operational, as was her Germain electrical fire-control system and the six sheep placed in the turret were unharmed. One splinter struck Masséna above her armour belt and left a 15-centimetre sized hole in her hull. Another 50-kilogram (110 lb) splinter landed within a few metres of the Naval Minister, Camille Pelletan, who was observing the trials.

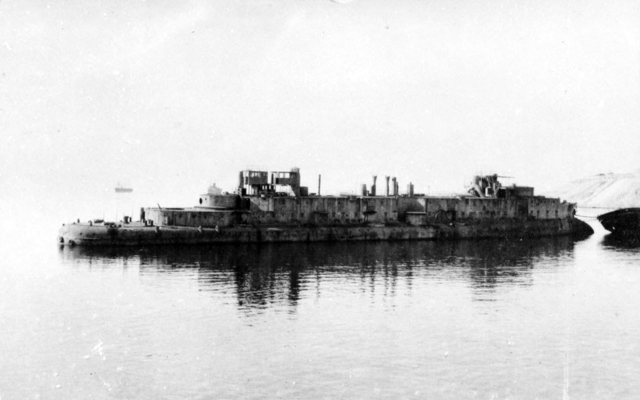
Masséna scuttled as a breakwater off Gallipoli in 1915

During her period in the Reserve Division, Masséna was manned with a reduced crew that would be completed with naval reservists if the vessel needed to be activated for maneuvers or to take the place of a front-line battleship during a refit. Masséna was present for the 1907 fleet maneuvers, which again saw the Northern and Mediterranean Squadrons unite for large-scale operations held off the coast of French Morocco and in the western Mediterranean. The exercises consisted of three phases and began on 2 July and concluded on 30 July. On 13 January 1908, she joined the battleships République, Patrie, Gaulois, Charlemagne, Saint Louis, and Jauréguiberry for a cruise in the Mediterranean, first to Golfe-Juan and then to Villefranche-sur-Mer, where the squadron stayed for a month. Masséna hosted President Armand Fallières during a major fleet review held off Toulon on 4 September 1911. On 16 October 1912, Masséna, Gaulois, Saint Louis, Carnot, Bouvet, and Jauréguiberry were activated for training duties as the 3rd Squadron of the Mediterranean Squadron; in July 1913, they were joined by Charlemagne. The squadron was dissolved on 11 November and Masséna returned to the reserve.

Early in 1914, the French Naval Minister Ernest Monis decided to discard Masséna, owing to the cost of maintaining the obsolete battleship, which was by then more than fifteen years old. She was reduced to a hulk in 1915. That year, the Triple Entente had launched an invasion at Gallipoli in an attempt to capture Constantinople, knock the Ottoman Empire out of the war, and open a route to supply Russia via the Dardanelles. Too old for active service, Masséna did not take part in the ensuing Gallipoli Campaign, which had stalled by the end of 1915, having made no significant progress. The Entente decided to withdraw from the operation, and the old battleship did see some use here. Masséna was towed from Toulon to Cape Helles on the Gallipoli Peninsula late in 1915, and scuttled there on 9 November to form a breakwater to protect the evacuation effort that withdrew the Allied expeditionary force in January 1916.
