= French battleship Charles Martel =

Pre-dreadnought battleship of the French Navy

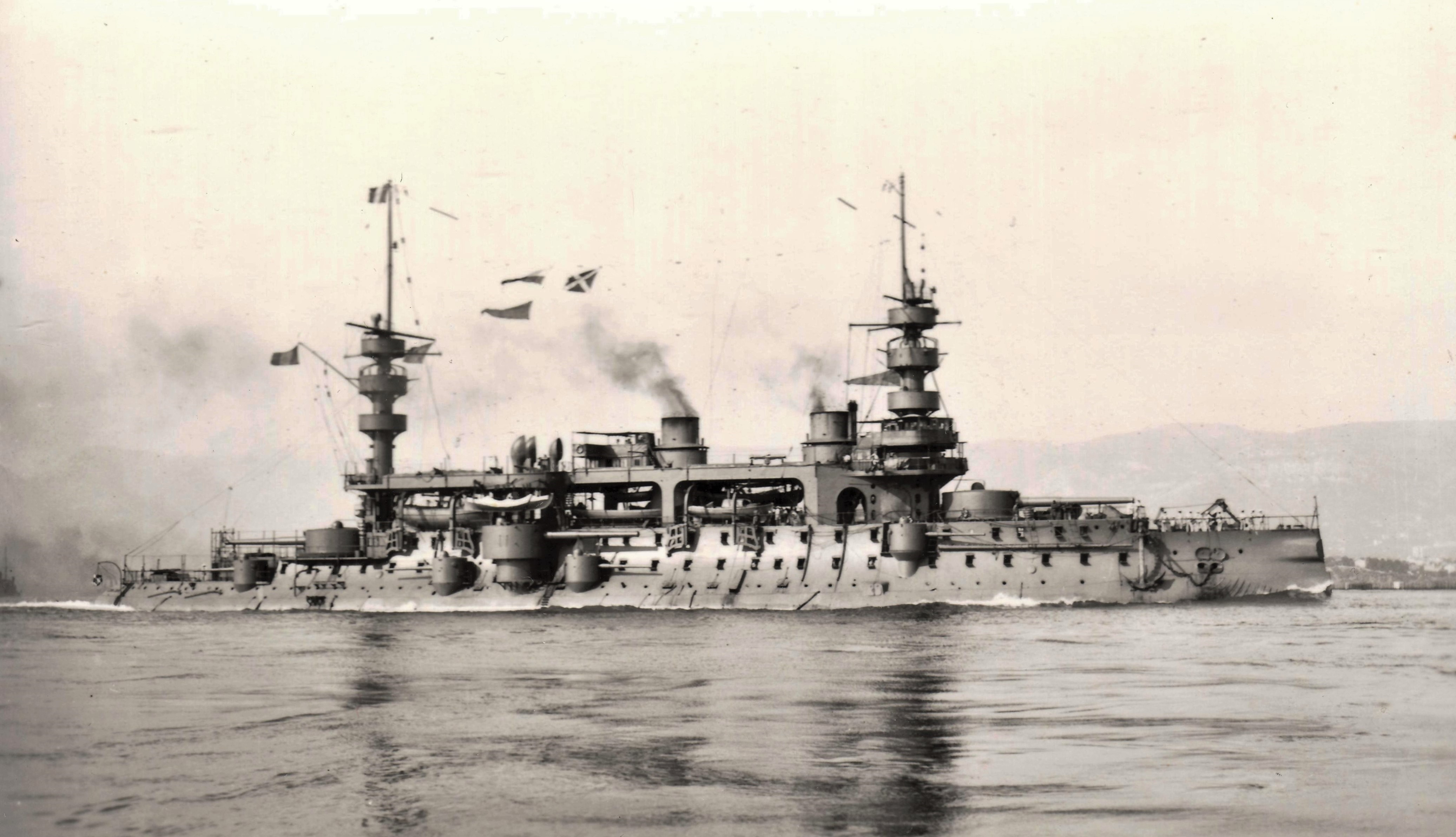
- A postcard of Charles Martel underway before 1914

Class overview
- Preceded by: Brennus
- Succeeded by: Carnot

History

France
- Name: Charles Martel
- Namesake: Charles Martel
- Ordered: 10 September 1890
- Builder: Arsenal de Brest
- Laid down: 1 August 1891
- Launched: 29 August 1893
- Commissioned: 20 February 1897
- Decommissioned: 1 April 1914
- Reclassified: As a barracks ship, 1 April 1914
- Stricken: 30 October 1919
- Fate: Sold for scrap, 20 December 1920

General characteristics (as completed)
- Type: Pre-dreadnought battleship
- Displacement: 11,839 t (11,652 long tons) (normal); 12,145 t (11,953 long tons) (full load)
- Length: 121.59 m (398 ft 11 in) (o/a)
- Beam: 21.71 m (71 ft 3 in)
- Draft: 8.4 m (27 ft 7 in)
- Installed power: 24 water-tube boilers; 13,070 PS (9,610 kW)
- Propulsion: 2 shafts; 2 triple-expansion steam engines
- Speed: 18 knots (33 km/h; 21 mph)
- Range: 2,218 nmi (4,108 km; 2,552 mi) at 13.81 knots (25.58 km/h; 15.89 mph)
- Complement: 651; 751 as a flagship
- Armament: 2 × single 305 mm (12 in) guns; 2 × single 274 mm (10.8 in) guns; 8 × single 138 mm (5.4 in) guns; 4 × single 65 mm (2.6 in) guns; 16 × 47 mm (1.9 in) guns; 4 × 450 mm (17.7 in) torpedo tubes
- Armor: Belt: 31 to 45 cm (12.2 to 17.7 in); Turrets: 37 cm (14.6 in); Barbettes: 32 cm (13 in); Conning tower: 23 cm (9.1 in); Deck: 7–10 cm (2.8–3.9 in)

Charles Martel was a pre-dreadnought battleship of the French Navy built in the 1890s. Completed in 1897, she was a member of a group of five broadly similar battleships ordered as part of the French response to a major British naval construction program. The five ships were built to the same basic design parameters, though the individual architects were allowed to deviate from each other in other details. Like her half-sisters—Carnot, Jauréguiberry, Bouvet, and Masséna—she was armed with a main battery of two 305 mm (12 in) guns and two 274 mm (10.8 in) guns. The ship had a top speed of 18 knots (33 km/h; 21 mph).

Charles Martel spent her active career in the Escadre de la Méditerranée (Mediterranean Squadron) of the French fleet, first in the active squadron, and later in the Escadre de réserve (Reserve Squadron). She regularly participated in fleet maneuvers, and in the 1901 exercises, the submarine Gustave Zédé hit her with a training torpedo. Charles Martel spent just five years in the active squadron, having been surpassed by more modern battleships during a period of rapid developments in naval technology. She spent the years 1902–1914 mostly in reserve, and the navy decommissioned the vessel in early 1914, hulking her and converting her into a barracks ship. After the outbreak of World War I in August, her guns were removed for use on the front and she briefly served as a prison ship. Charles Martel was condemned in 1919 and was sold for scrap the following year.

== Design ==
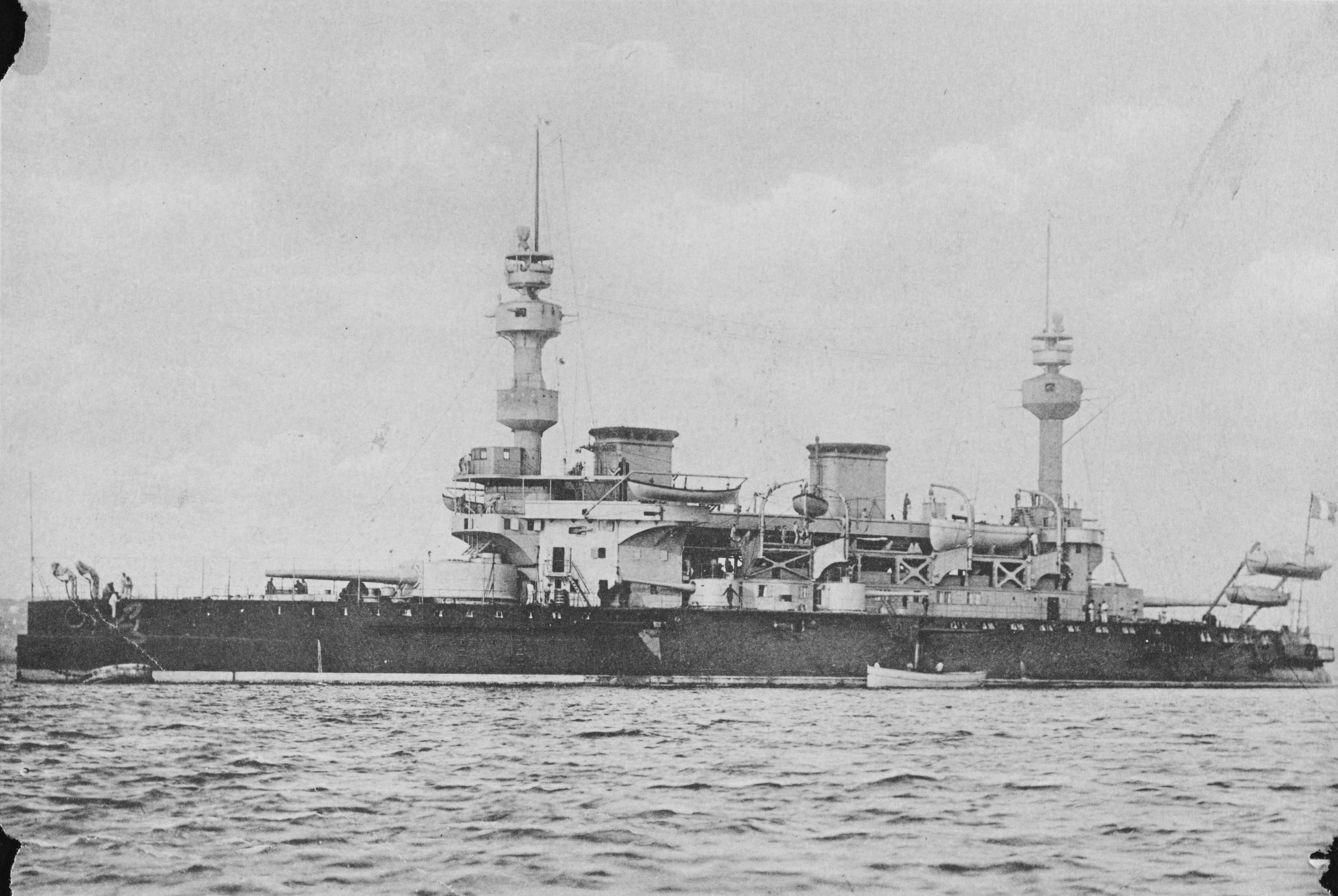
Brennus, c. 1894, which formed the basis for Charles Martel's design

In 1889, the British Royal Navy passed the Naval Defence Act that resulted in the construction of the eight Royal Sovereign-class battleships; this major expansion of naval power led the French government to pass its reply, the Statut Naval (Naval Law) of 1890. The law called for a total of twenty-four "cuirasses d'escadre" (squadron battleships) and a host of other vessels, including coastal defense battleships, cruisers, and torpedo boats. The first stage of the program was to be a group of four squadron battleships that were built to different designs but met the same basic characteristics, including armor, armament, and displacement. The naval high command issued the basic requirements on 24 December 1889; displacement would not exceed 14,000 metric tons (13,779 long tons), the primary armament was to consist of 34-centimeter (13.4 in) and 27 cm (10.6 in) guns, the belt armor should be 45 cm (17.7 in), and the ships should maintain a top speed of 17 knots (31 km/h; 20 mph). The secondary battery was to be either 14 cm (5.5 in) or 16 cm (6.3 in) caliber, with as many guns fitted as space would allow.

The basic design for the ships was based on the previous battleship Brennus, but instead of mounting the main battery all on the centerline, the ships used the lozenge arrangement of the earlier Magenta, which moved two of the main battery guns to single turrets on the wings. Five naval architects submitted designs to the high command; the design that became Charles Martel was prepared by Charles Ernest Huin, who had also designed the ironclad battleship Hoche. Political considerations, namely parliamentary objections to increases in naval expenditures, led the designers to limit displacement to around 12,000 metric tons (11,810 long tons). Huin submitted his finalized proposal in line with these considerations on 12 August 1890, and it was accepted and ordered on 10 September. Though the program called for four ships to be built in the first year, five were ultimately ordered: Charles Martel, Carnot, Jauréguiberry, Bouvet, and Masséna.

An earlier vessel, also named Charles Martel, had been laid down in 1884 and cancelled under the tenure of Admiral Théophile Aube. The vessel, along with a sister ship named Brennus, was a modified version of the Marceau-class ironclad battleships. After Aube's retirement in 1887, the plans for the ships were entirely redesigned, though the later pair of ships are sometimes conflated with the earlier, cancelled designs. This may be due to the fact that both of the ships named Brennus were built in the same shipyard, and material assembled for the first vessel was used in the construction of the second. The two pairs of ships were, nevertheless, distinct vessels.

The new Charles Martel and her half-sisters were disappointments in service; they generally suffered from stability problems, and Louis-Émile Bertin, the Director of Naval Construction in the late 1890s, referred to the ships as chavirables (prone to "capsizing"). All five of the vessels compared poorly to their British counterparts, particularly their contemporaries of the Majestic class. The ships suffered from a lack of uniformity of equipment, which made them hard to maintain in service, and their mixed gun batteries comprising several calibers made gunnery in combat conditions difficult, since shell splashes were hard to differentiate. Many of the problems that plagued the ships in service, particularly their stability and seakeeping, were a result of the limitation on their displacement.

=== General characteristics and machinery ===
Charles Martel was 115.49 meters (378 ft 11 in) long between perpendiculars and 121.59 meters (398 ft 11 in) long overall. The ship had a beam of 21.71 m (71 ft 3 in), a forward draft of 7.6 m (24 ft 11 in) and a draft of 8.4 m (27 ft 7 in) at the stern. She displaced 11,839 metric tons (11,652 long tons) at normal load and 12,145 t (11,953 long tons) at full load. Charles Martel's hull was subdivided by 13 transverse bulkheads into 14 watertight compartments and she was fitted with a ram bow. Her forecastle gave her a high freeboard forward, but her quarterdeck was cut down to the main deck level aft. Her hull was given a marked tumblehome to give the 27 cm guns wide fields of fire. Like earlier Huin designs, Charles Martel had a very tall superstructure; she was equipped with two heavy military masts, with a tall flying deck between them. In service, the tall superstructure made her top-heavy, though her high freeboard made her very seaworthy. She normally had a crew of 651 officers and enlisted men, which increased to 751 when serving as a flagship.

Charles Martel had two vertical, three-cylinder triple-expansion steam engines manufactured by Schneider-Creusot; each engine drove a single three-bladed, 5.7 m (18 ft 8 in) screw using steam supplied by twenty-four Lagrafel d'Allest water-tube boilers at a maximum pressure of 15 kg/cm^{2} (1,471 kPa; 213 psi). The boilers were divided into four boiler rooms and were ducted into two funnels. Her engines were rated at 13,070 metric horsepower (9,610 kW), which was intended to give the ship a speed of 17 knots (31 km/h; 20 mph) normally and up to 18 knots (33 km/h; 21 mph) using forced draft. During her sea trials on 5 May 1897, Charles Martel reached a speed of 18.13 knots (33.6 km/h; 20.9 mph) from 14,997 metric horsepower (11,030 kW). The ship could carry a maximum of 908 t (894 long tons) of coal, which gave her a range of 2,218 nautical miles (4,108 km; 2,552 mi) at a speed of 13.81 knots (25.6 km/h; 15.9 mph). Her 83-volt electrical power was provided by four 600-ampere dynamos.

=== Armament ===
Plan and profile of Charles Martel, showing the disposition of the ship's armament

Charles Martel's main armament consisted of two 45-caliber Canon de 305 mm Modèle 1887 guns in two single-gun turrets, one each fore and aft of the superstructure. The hydraulically worked turrets had a range of elevation of -5° to +15°. They fired 292-kilogram (644 lb) cast-iron projectiles at the rate of one round per minute. They had a muzzle velocity of 815 meters per second (2,670 ft/s) which gave a range of 12,500 meters (13,700 yd) at maximum elevation.

The ship's intermediate armament consisted of a pair of 45-caliber Canon de 274 mm (10.8 in) Modèle 1887 guns in single-gun wing turrets amidships on each side and sponsoned out over the tumblehome of the ship's sides. Their turrets had the same range of elevation as the main battery. The guns had the same rate of fire and muzzle velocity as the larger guns, but their cast-iron shells only weighed 216 kg (476 lb) and their maximum range was slightly less at 11,800 m (12,900 yd).

Her secondary armament consisted of eight 45-caliber Canon de 138 mm (5.4 in) Modèle 1888-91 guns which were mounted in single-gun turrets at the corners of the superstructure. The turrets had an elevation range of from -5° to +15°. The guns could fire their 35 kg (77 lb) shells at a rate of fire of four rounds per minute. They had a muzzle velocity of 730 m/s (2,400 ft/s) and a range of 9,400 m (10,300 yd).

Defense against torpedo boats was provided by six quick-firing (QF) 50-caliber Canon de 65 mm (2.6 in) Modèle 1891 guns, a dozen 40-caliber QF 47 mm (1.9 in) Modèle 1885 guns, and five 20-caliber QF 37 mm (1.5 in) revolving cannon, all in unprotected single mounts on the superstructure and in platforms on the military masts. The 65 mm guns had a rate of fire of eight rounds per minute and a range of 5,400 m (5,900 yd) while 47 mm guns could fire nine to fifteen rounds per minute to a range of 4,000 m (4,400 yd). The five-barrel 37 mm revolving guns had a rate of fire of twenty to twenty-five rounds per minute and a range of 2,000 m (2,200 yd). While conducting her sea trials in 1896, two of Charles Martel's 65 mm and all of her 37 mm guns were replaced by four additional 47 mm guns.

Her armament suite was rounded out by four 450 mm (17.7 in) torpedo tubes, two of which were submerged in the ship's hull, one on each broadside, with the other two on single rotating mounts abaft the forward 138 mm turrets; each mount could traverse an arc from 30° to 110° off the centerline. Charles Martel was initially equipped with Modèle 1892 torpedoes that had a 75-kilogram (165 lb) warhead and a range of 800 m (870 yd) at a speed of 27.5 knots (50.9 km/h; 31.6 mph).

=== Armor ===
Charles Martel's armor weighed 4,569 t (4,497 long tons), 38.5% of the ship's displacement, and was constructed from a mix of nickel steel and compound armor plates that were manufactured by Schneider-Creusot. The waterline belt extended the full length of the ship and it had an average height of 2 m (6 ft 7 in), although it reduced to 1.8 m (5 ft 11 in) aft. The belt had a maximum thickness of 450 mm amidships where it protected the ammunition magazines and propulsion machinery spaces and reduced to 350 mm (13.8 in) forward and 310 mm (12.2 in) aft. To save weight, the belt was tapered to a thickness at its bottom edge of 250 mm (9.8 in) amidships and 170 mm (6.7 in) at the ends of the ship. Above the belt was a 100 mm (3.9 in) thick strake of armor that created a highly-subdivided cofferdam to reduce the risk of flooding from battle damage. Coal storage bunkers were placed behind the upper side armor to increase its strength.

The faces and sides of the main and intermediate turrets were protected by armor plates 370 mm (14.6 in) in thickness and they had 70 mm (2.8 in) roofs. Their barbettes had 320 mm (13 in) of nickel-steel armor. The secondary turrets had 100 mm sides and 20 mm (0.8 in) roofs. The conning tower had walls 230 mm (9.1 in) thick and its communications tube was protected by 200 mm (7.9 in) of armor. The curved armored deck was 70 mm on the flat and 100 mm on its slope.

== Service history ==
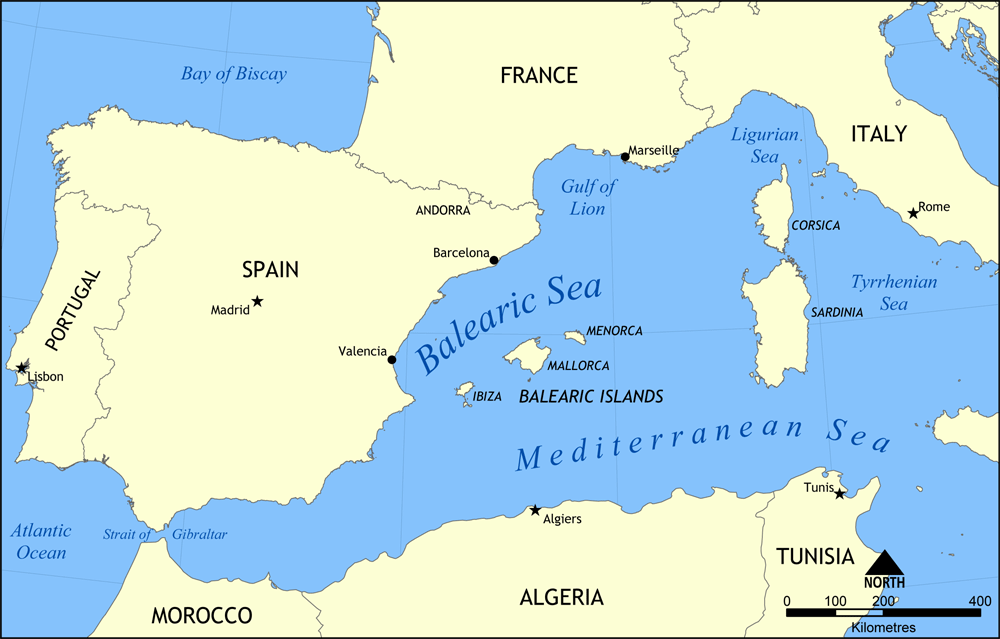
Map of the western Mediterranean, where Charles Martel spent the majority of her career

=== Active career ===
Charles Martel was laid down on 1 August 1891 by the Arsenal de Brest and launched on 29 August 1893. After completing fitting-out work, she was commissioned for her trials on 10 January 1896. In October they were interrupted so that the battleship could participate in a naval review in Cherbourg with President Félix Faure and Tsar Nicholas II. While conducting torpedo trials on 21 December, Charles Martel struck an uncharted rock that bent a propeller blade and slightly damaged the hull. Repairs were completed on 1 February 1897 and she was fully commissioned into the French Navy on 20 February. She was delayed in completing her sea trials, as her boiler tubes had to be replaced with a safer, weld-less design, following an accident aboard Jauréguiberry with the same type of tubes. Following her commissioning for service, she was assigned to the Escadre de la Méditerranée. While working up on 5 March, her rudder servomotor briefly declutched and the ship drifted onto a rock; damage was minimal and she began her voyage to Toulon three days later. On 6 August she became the flagship of Contre-amiral (Rear Admiral) Paul Dieulouard and took part in fleet maneuvers off Golfe-Juan and Les Salins d'Hyères the following month. Gunnery training revealed problems with some of the guns failing to return to battery that were rectified in October–November.

During a gunnery exercise on 29 March 1898, Charles Martel, together with her half-sisters Carnot, Jauréguiberry, and the older battleships Brennus and Marceau, sank the aviso Pétrel. Faure came aboard Charles Martel to observe a training exercise on 14–16 April and the ship visited Corsica between 21 and 31 May. She participated in the annual fleet maneuvers beginning on 8 July and made port visits in French North Africa before returning to Toulon on 30 July. The ship was assigned to the 2^{e} Division cuirassée (Second Battleship Division) of the Escadre de la Méditerranée in mid-September and Contre-amiral Germain Roustan hoisted his flag aboard, replacing Dieulouard, on 25 September. As tensions rose during the Fashoda Incident with Great Britain, the fleet mobilized on 18 October and sortied to Les Salins d'Hyères. It stood down on 5 November and Charles Martel was docked for maintenance from 11 to 24 November.

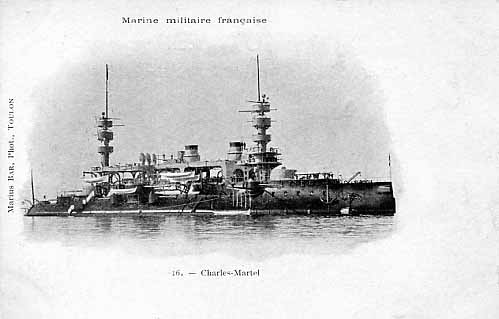
A postcard of Charles Martel

In February and March 1899, the squadron visited French Mediterranean ports and Barcelona, Spain. After repairs in Toulon in September, the ship joined the squadron in a cruise in the Eastern Mediterranean that lasted from 11 October to 21 December. She was docked for maintenance in January 1900 and then joined the battleships Brennus, Gaulois, Charlemagne, Bouvet, and Jauréguiberry and four protected cruisers for maneuvers off Golfe-Juan, including night-firing training on 6 March. Over the course of April, the ships visited numerous French ports along the Mediterranean coast, and on 31 May the fleet steamed to Corsica for a visit that lasted until 8 June. During the fleet maneuvers held that June, Charles Martel led Group II, which included four cruisers and a pair of destroyers, under Roustan's command. The exercises included a blockade of Group III's battleships by Group II. The Escadre de la Méditerranée then rendezvoused with the Escadre du Nord (Northern Squadron) off the coast of Portugal before proceeding to Quiberon Bay for joint maneuvers in July. The maneuvers concluded with a naval review in Cherbourg on 19 July for President Émile Loubet. On 1 August, the fleet departed for Toulon, arriving on 14 August. On 26 September, Contre-amiral Charles Aubry de la Noé relived Roustan as the commander of the 2^{e} Division cuirassée.

The year 1901 passed uneventfully for Charles Martel, except for the fleet maneuvers conducted that year. During the June exercises, Charles Martel was hit by a training torpedo fired by the submarine Gustave Zédé, which was ruled against the rules, and her light guns sank the torpedo boat 104 during target practice. The 2^{e} Division cuirassée sailed on 22 August to welcome Nicholas II and his wife, and arrived at Dunkirk, having rendezvoused with the Escadre du Nord on 31 August at Cherbourg en route. On 15 October Aubry de la Noé was relieved by Contre-amiral René-Julien Marquis. Charles Martel was docked for maintenance at the end of the month and had a radio telegraph installed. In early 1902, the ship made the usual visits to French Mediterranean ports.

=== Reserve fleet ===
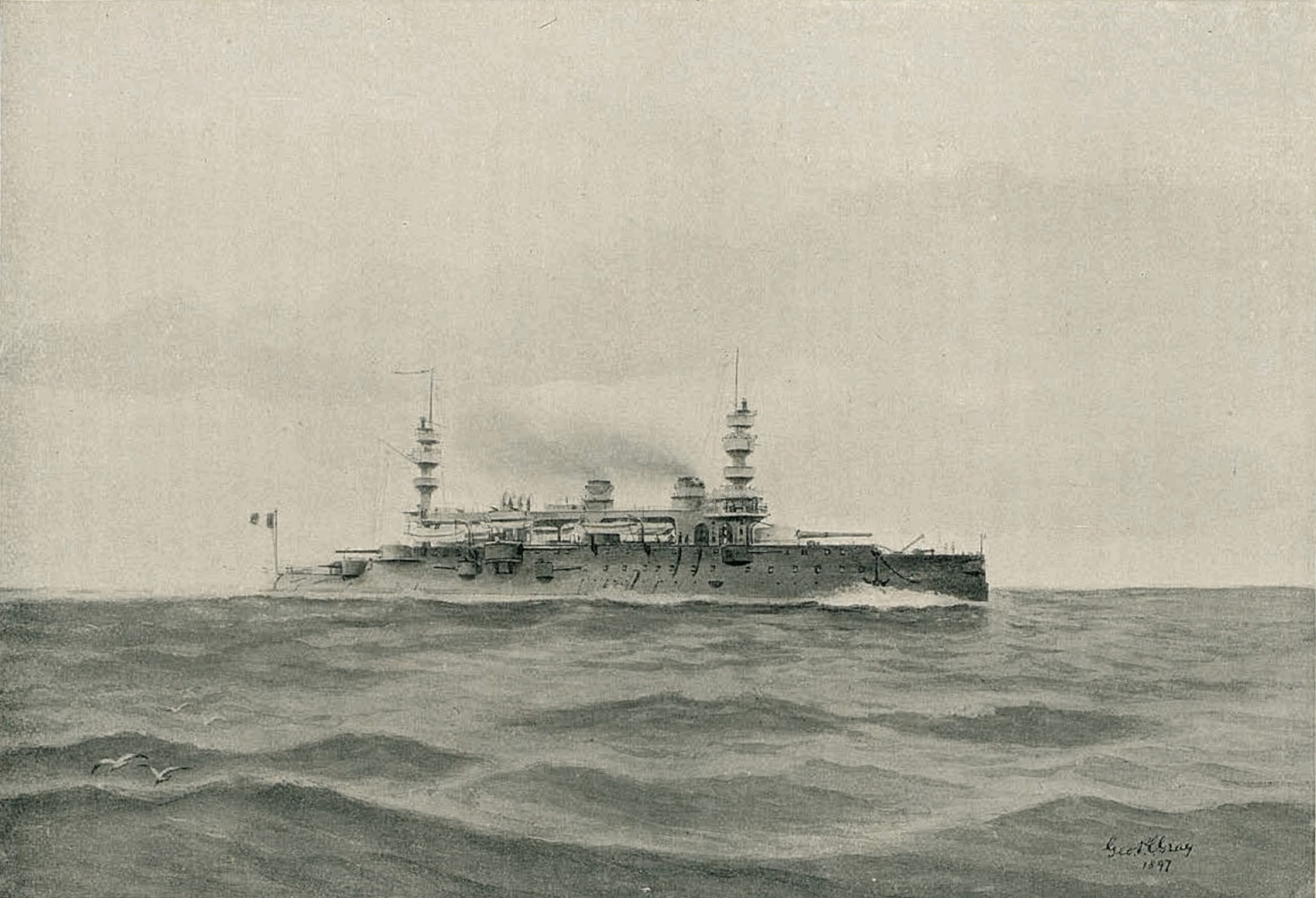
Sketch of Charles Martel underway from Brassey's Naval Annual, 1897

On 10 May Marquis was transferred to a new job and Charles Martel was transferred to the Division de réserve of the Escadre de la Méditerranée, along with the battleships Brennus, Carnot, and Hoche and the armored cruisers Pothuau, Amiral Charner, and Bruix as more modern ships had joined the fleet. She initially served as the flagship of Contre-amiral Joseph Besson, though by July 1903 her place as flagship had been taken by the battleship Saint Louis. During this period in reserve, the ship was frequently reactivated for short periods to replace active vessels that had to be docked for maintenance. During the fleet maneuvers in July 1905, Charles Martel's main guns had a rate of fire of one round every nine minutes and her intermediate guns one round about every four minutes. She remained in the Escadre de réserve; by 1906, she was in the 2^{e} Division, under the command of Contre-amiral Paul-Louis Germinet. Her above-water torpedo tubes were removed on 13 June. On 16 September, she was present for a major fleet review in Marseille that saw visits from British, Spanish, and Italian squadrons. The ship was maintained in a state of en disponibilité armée, a state of reduced readiness; Charles Martel was in full commission for three months of the year for training, and in reserve with a reduced crew for the remainder. She remained in this status for the duration of 1907. During an exercise off Corsica, the armored cruiser Condé ran aground on 20 November 1907 during a severe storm. After lightening the cruiser, Charles Martel and the armored cruiser Victor Hugo were able to pull Condé off.

In September 1909 the battleship became the flagship of the Inspector of Flotillas and one of her propellers was damaged by an errant torpedo while the inspector was observing firing exercises by torpedo boats. The following month the Marine nationale was reorganized with the Escadre de la Méditerranée redesignated as the 1^{re} Escadre and the Escadre du Nord as the 2^{e} Escadre, since by then the six République and Liberté-class battleships had entered service. The new ships allowed for the creation of a new 2^{e} Escadre de ligne (Second Battle Squadron) within the 1^{re} Escadre, Charles Martel became the replacement ship for the 2^{e} Escadre on 5 October and departed for Cherbourg on 5 November, sustaining some storm damage en route. After her arrival on the 13th, she welcomed King Manuel II of Portugal to France and then escorted the British royal yacht Victoria and Albert, with King Edward VII aboard, back to Britain. The ship was assigned to 2^{e} Division de ligne of the 2^{e} Escadre du ligne on 16 October 1910. Contre-amiral Achille Adam hoisted his flag aboard the ship on 21 July 1911. When the Danton-class battleships began entering service in that year, the fleet was reorganized again, with Charles Martel and the other older ships being transferred to the new 3^{e} Escadre de ligne on 5 October, which was based in Brest, and Adam becoming commander of its 2^{e} Division de ligne.

The ship's hydraulic reloading machinery for the main and intermediate turrets was replaced by manual-loading gear in August 1911, which generally rendered her combat ineffective. She was present for another naval review off Toulon on 4 September. Adam hauled his flag down on 25 February 1912 and Charles Martel was reduced to reserve status on 1 March. She was reduced to special reserve on 1 July and was transferred to Landévennec, Brittany, in November 1913. Together with her contemporaries Brennus, Carnot and Masséna, Charles Martel was decommissioned and hulked to serve as a barracks ship on 1 April 1914.

After the beginning of World War I in August, the ship hosted the headquarters controlling German prisoners of war temporarily housed in fortresses in Brittany in late September. Some of her boilers were removed during the war to equip three tugboats; her main guns were removed in 1915 and bored out to convert them to Obusier de 370 mm (14.6 in) Modèle 1915 railroad howitzers. The ship's 274 mm guns were converted into Canon de 274 Modèle 87/93 Glissement railroad guns two years later and her 138.6 mm guns were placed on wheeled gun carriages for service with the army. Late in the war she was used as a prison ship. Charles Martel was condemned on 30 October 1919 and was listed for sale on 21 September 1920. She was purchased for 675,000 francs on 20 December by the Dutch firm Frank Rijsdijk’s Industriële Ondernemingen N.V. and towed its ship breaking yard in Hendrik-Ido-Ambacht to begin demolition.
