= French battleship Jauréguiberry =

Pre-dreadnought battleship constructed for the French Navy

- Jauréguiberry steaming at high speed, probably during her sea trials in 1896–1897

Class overview
- Preceded by: Carnot
- Succeeded by: Masséna

History

France
- Name: Jauréguiberry
- Namesake: Bernard Jauréguiberry
- Ordered: 8 April 1891
- Builder: Forges et Chantiers de la Méditerranée, La Seyne-sur-Mer
- Laid down: 23 April 1891
- Launched: 27 October 1893
- Completed: 30 January 1897
- Commissioned: 16 February 1897
- Decommissioned: 30 March 1919
- Stricken: 20 June 1920
- Fate: Sold for scrap, 23 June 1934

General characteristics
- Type: Pre-dreadnought battleship
- Displacement: 11,818 t (11,631 long tons) (normal); 12,229 t (12,036 long tons) (full load)
- Length: 111.9 m (367 ft 2 in)
- Beam: 23 m (75 ft 6 in)
- Draft: 8.45 m (27 ft 9 in)
- Installed power: 24 boilers; 14,441 ihp (10,769 kW)
- Propulsion: 2 shafts; 2 triple-expansion steam engines
- Speed: 17.5 knots (32.4 km/h; 20.1 mph)
- Range: 3,920 nmi (7,260 km; 4,510 mi) at 10 knots (19 km/h; 12 mph)
- Complement: 597 (1905)
- Armament: 2 × single 305 mm (12 in) guns; 2 × single 274 mm (10.8 in) guns; 4 × twin 138 mm (5.4 in) guns; 4 × single 65 mm (2.6 in) guns; 14 × single 47 mm (1.9 in) guns; 6 × 450 mm (17.7 in) torpedo tubes
- Armor: Waterline belt: 160–400 mm (6.3–15.7 in); Upper belt: 120–170 mm (4.7–6.7 in); Deck: 90 mm (3.5 in); Turrets: 280–370 mm (11–15 in); Conning tower: 250 mm (9.8 in)

Jauréguiberry was a pre-dreadnought battleship constructed for the French Navy (French: Marine Nationale) in the 1890s. Built in response to a naval expansion program of the British Royal Navy, she was one of a group of five roughly similar battleships, including Masséna, Bouvet, Carnot, and Charles Martel. Jauréguiberry was armed with a mixed battery of 305 mm (12 in), 274 mm (10.8 in) and 138 mm (5.4 in) guns. Constraints on displacement imposed by the French naval command produced a series of ships that were significantly inferior to their British counterparts, suffering from poor stability and a mixed armament that was difficult to control in combat conditions.

In peacetime the ship participated in routine training exercises and cruises in the Mediterranean Sea, primarily as part of the Mediterranean Squadron. The ship was involved in several accidents, including a boiler explosion and an accidental torpedo detonation that delayed her entry into service in 1897. Two more torpedo explosions occurred in 1902 and 1905, and she ran aground during a visit to Portsmouth in August 1905. By 1907, she had been transferred to the Reserve Division, although she continued to participate in maneuvers and other peacetime activities.

Following the outbreak of World War I in July 1914, Jauréguiberry escorted troop convoys from North Africa and India to France. She supported French troops during the Gallipoli Campaign, including during the landing at Cape Helles in April 1915, before she became guardship at Port Said from 1916 until the end of the war. Upon her return to France in 1919 she became an accommodation hulk until 1932. The ship was sold for scrap in 1934.

== Background and design ==
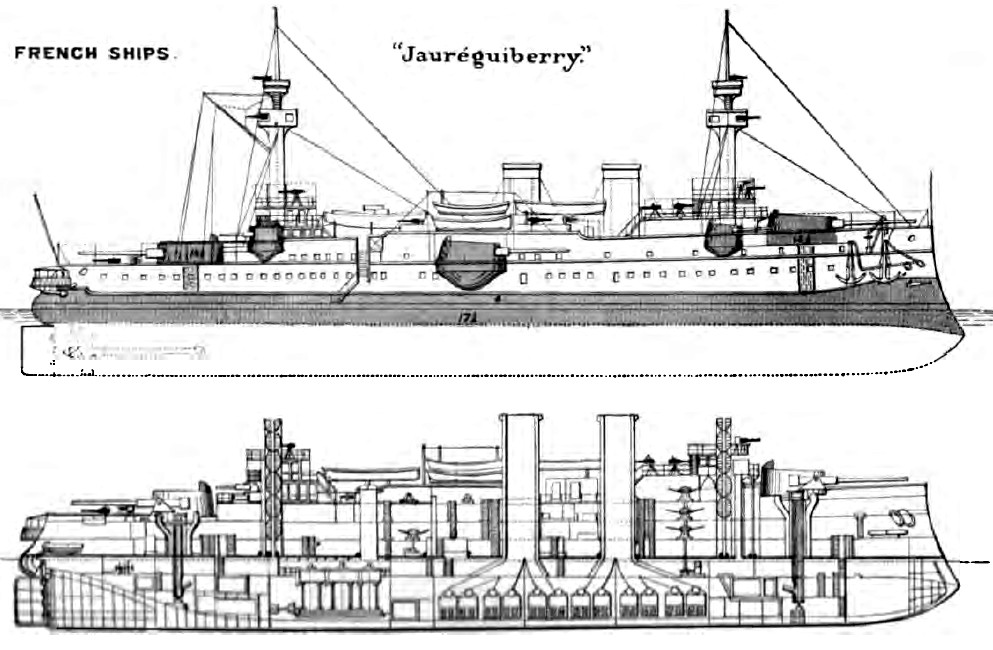
Right elevation and section, from Brassey's Naval Annual 1897

In 1889, the British Royal Navy passed the Naval Defence Act, which resulted in the construction of the eight Royal Sovereign-class battleships; this major expansion of naval power led the French government to respond with the Statut Naval (Naval Law) of 1890. The law called for twenty-four "cuirasses d'escadre" (squadron battleships) and a host of other vessels, including coastal-defense battleships, cruisers, and torpedo boats. The first stage of the program was to be a group of four squadron battleships built to different designs, but meeting the same basic requirements, including armor, armament, and displacement.

The naval high command issued the basic characteristics on 24 December 1889; displacement should not exceed 14,000 metric tons (13,779 long tons), the main battery was to consist of 34-centimeter (13.4 in) and 27 cm (10.6 in) guns, the belt armor should be 45 cm (17.7 in), and the ships should maintain a top speed of 17 knots (31 km/h; 20 mph). The secondary armament was to be either 14 cm (5.5 in) or 16 cm (6.3 in) caliber, with as many guns fitted as space would allow.

The basic design for the ships was based on the previous battleship Brennus, but instead of mounting the main battery all on the centerline, the ships used the lozenge arrangement of the earlier vessel Magenta, which moved two of the main battery guns to single turrets on the wings. Although the navy had stipulated that displacement could be up to 14,000 metric tons, political considerations, namely parliamentary objections to increases in naval expenditures, led the designers to limit displacement to around 12,000 metric tons (11,810 long tons).

Five naval architects submitted proposals to the competition. The design for Jauréguiberry was prepared by Amable Lagane, the director of naval construction at the Forges et Chantiers de la Méditerranée shipyard in La Seyne-sur-Mer. Lagane had previously supervised the construction of the Magenta-class ironclad Marceau, which influenced his design for Jauréguiberry. Though the program called for four ships to be built in the first year, five were ultimately ordered: Jauréguiberry, Charles Martel, Masséna, Carnot, and Bouvet. Jauréguiberry used a very similar hull form to Marceau's, and as a result, was shorter and wider than the other vessels.

The design for Jauréguiberry was also influenced by the Chilean battleship Capitán Prat, then under construction in France (and which also had been designed by Lagane). A small vessel, Capitán Prat had adopted twin-gun turrets for her secondary battery to save space that would have been taken up by traditional casemate mountings. Lagane incorporated that solution in Jauréguiberry, though she was the only French battleship of the program to use that arrangement owing to fears that the rate of fire would be reduced and that the turrets would be more vulnerable to being disabled by a single lucky hit. She was the first French battleship to use electric motors to operate her main-battery turrets.

She and her half-sisters were disappointments in service; they generally suffered from stability problems, and Louis-Émile Bertin, the Director of Naval Construction in the late 1890s, referred to the ships as "chavirables" (prone to capsizing). All five of the vessels compared poorly to their British counterparts, particularly their contemporaries of the Majestic class. The ships suffered from a lack of uniformity of equipment, which made them hard to maintain in service, and their mixed gun batteries comprising several calibers made gunnery in combat conditions difficult, since the splashes of relatively similarly sized shells were hard to differentiate and thus made it difficult to calculate corrections to hit the target. Many of the problems that plagued the ships in service were a result of the limitation on their displacement, particularly their stability and seakeeping.

=== General characteristics and machinery ===
Jauréguiberry was 111.9 meters (367 ft 2 in) long overall. She had a maximum beam of 23 meters (75 ft 6 in) and a draft of 8.45 meters (27 ft 9 in). She displaced 11,818 metric tons (11,631 long tons) at normal load and 12,229 metric tons (12,036 long tons) at full load. She was fitted with two heavy military masts with fighting tops. In 1905 her captain described her as an excellent sea-boat and a good fighting ship, although her secondary armament was too light. He also said that she was stable and well laid-out with good living conditions. She had a crew of 631 officers and enlisted sailors.

Jauréguiberry had two vertical triple-expansion steam engines, also built by Forges et Chantiers de la Méditerranée, which were designed to give the ship a speed of 17.5 knots (32.4 km/h; 20.1 mph). On trials they developed 14,441 indicated horsepower (10,769 kW) and drove the ship to a maximum speed of 17.71 knots (32.80 km/h; 20.38 mph). Each engine drove a 5.7-meter (18 ft 8 in) propeller. Twenty-four Lagraffel d'Allest water-tube boilers provided steam for the engines at a pressure of 15 kg/cm^{2} (1,471 kPa; 213 psi). The boilers were distributed between six boiler rooms and were ducted into a pair of closely spaced funnels. She normally carried 750 metric tons (738 long tons) of coal, but could carry a maximum of 1,080 metric tons (1,063 long tons). This gave her a radius of action of 3,920 nautical miles (7,260 km; 4,510 mi) at 10 knots (19 km/h; 12 mph).

=== Armament ===
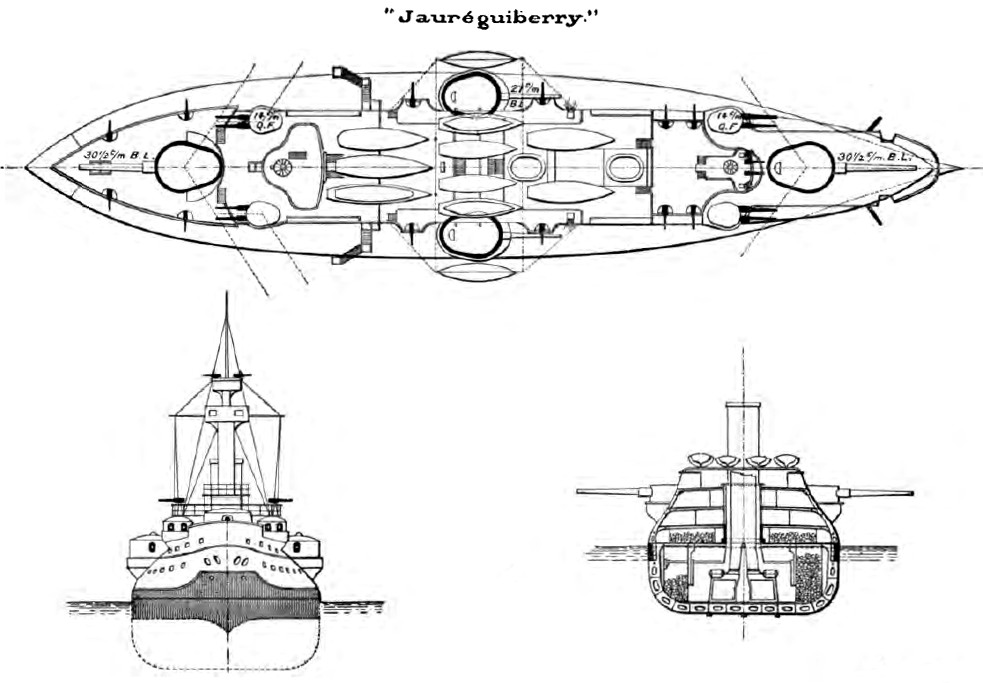
Line-drawing showing the arrangement and firing arcs of the ship's main battery

Jauréguiberry's main armament consisted of two 45-caliber Canon de 305 mm (12 in) Modèle 1887 guns in two single-gun turrets, one each fore and aft of the superstructure. A pair of 45-caliber Canon de 274 mm (10.8 in) Modèle 1887 guns were mounted in single-gun wing turrets, one amidships on each side, sponsoned out over the tumblehome of the ship's sides. Each 305 mm turret had an arc of fire of 250°. The 305 mm guns fired 292-kilogram (644 lb) cast iron (CI) projectiles, or heavier 340-kilogram (750 lb) armor-piercing (AP) and semi-armor-piercing (SAP) shells at a muzzle velocity of 780 to 815 meters per second (2,560 to 2,670 ft/s). The 274 mm guns were also supplied with a mix of CI, AP, and SAP shells, with the same muzzle velocity as the larger guns. The ship's offensive armament was completed by a secondary battery of eight 45-caliber Canon de 138.6 mm (5.5 in) Modèle 1891 guns mounted in manually operated twin-gun turrets. The turrets were placed at the corners of the superstructure with 160° arcs of fire. They fired 30 kg (66 lb) CI or 35 kg (77 lb) AP or SAP shells at a muzzle velocity of 730 to 770 meters per second (2,400 to 2,500 ft/s).

Defense against torpedo boats was provided by a variety of light-caliber weapons. Sources disagree on the number and types, possibly indicating changes over the ship's lifetime. All sources agree on four 50-caliber (65-millimeter (2.6 in)) guns. These fired a 4-kilogram (8.8 lb) shell at a muzzle velocity of 715 meters per second (2,350 ft/s). Gibbons and Gardiner agree on twelve, later eighteen, although d'Ausson lists fourteen, 47 mm (1.9 in) 40-caliber Canon de 47 mm Modèle 1885 Hotchkiss guns that were mounted in the fighting tops and on the superstructure. They fired a 1.49-kilogram (3.3 lb) projectile at 610 meters per second (2,000 ft/s) to a maximum range of 4,000 meters (4,400 yd). Their theoretical maximum rate of fire was fifteen rounds per minute, but only seven rounds per minute sustained. Gibbons and Gardiner agree that eight 37 mm (1.5 in) Hotchkiss 5-barrel revolving guns were mounted on the fore and aft superstructures, although none are listed by d'Ausson.

The ship was initially fitted with 450-millimeter (17.7 in) torpedo tubes, though sources disagree on the number. Gardiner states that she had two submerged tubes and two above-water tubes, but d'Ausson states that she had six tubes, two each above water in the bow and stern and one on each broadside underwater. The above-water tubes were removed during a refit in 1906. The M1892 torpedoes carried a 75 kg (165 lb) warhead, and could be set at 27.5 knots (50.9 km/h; 31.6 mph) or 32.5 knots (60.2 km/h; 37.4 mph), which could reach targets at 1,000 m (3,300 ft) or 800 m (2,600 ft), respectively.

=== Armor ===
Jauréguiberry had a total of 3,960 metric tons (3,897 long tons) of nickel-steel armor; equal to 33.5% of her normal displacement. Her waterline belt ranged from 160–400 mm (6.3–15.7 in) in thickness. Above the belt was a 100 mm (3.9 in) thick strake of side armor that created a highly divided cofferdam. Around the above-water torpedo tubes, the upper strake increased to 170 mm (6.7 in). The 90-millimeter (3.5 in) armored deck rested on the top of the waterline belt. Her 305 mm gun turrets were protected by 370 mm (15 in) of armor on the sides and faces while her 274 mm turrets had 280 mm (11 in) of armor. The ship's secondary turrets were protected by 100 millimeters (3.9 in) of armor. The walls of her conning tower were 250 mm (9.8 in) thick.

== Service ==
Jauréguiberry was ordered on 8 April 1891 and laid down on 23 April at Forges et Chantiers de la Méditerranée in La Seyne-sur-Mer. She was launched on 27 October 1893 and was complete enough to begin her sea trials on 30 January 1896. A tube in one of her boilers burst on 10 June during a 24-hour engine trial, killing six and wounding three. Two months later she suffered an accident while testing her main armament. She was finally commissioned on 16 February 1897, although the explosion of a torpedo's air chamber on 30 March delayed her assignment to the Mediterranean Squadron until 17 May. During this period, she was fitted with a new electric order-transmission system that relayed instructions from the ship's fire-control center to the guns, a marked improvement over the voice tubes that were in standard use in the world's navies at the time. Immediately on entering service, she and her half-sisters Charles Martel and Carnot were sent to join the International Squadron that had been assembled beginning in February. The multinational force also included ships of the Austro-Hungarian Navy, the Imperial German Navy, the Italian Regia Marina, the Imperial Russian Navy, and the British Royal Navy, and it was sent to intervene in the 1897–1898 Greek uprising on Crete against rule by the Ottoman Empire.

Throughout the ship's peacetime career, she was occupied with routine training exercises, which included gunnery training, combined maneuvers with torpedo boats and submarines, and practice attacks on coastal fortifications. One of the largest of these exercises was conducted between March and July 1900, and involved the Mediterranean Squadron and the Northern Squadron. On 6 March, Jauréguiberry joined the battleships Brennus, Gaulois, Charlemagne, Charles Martel, and Bouvet and four protected cruisers for maneuvers off Golfe-Juan, including night-firing training. Over the course of April, the ships visited numerous French ports along the Mediterranean coast, and on 31 May the fleet steamed to Corsica for a visit that lasted until 8 June. After completing its own exercises in the Mediterranean, the Mediterranean Squadron rendezvoused with the Northern Squadron off Lisbon, Portugal, in late June before proceeding to Quiberon Bay for joint maneuvers in July. The maneuvers concluded with a naval review in Cherbourg on 19 July for President Émile Loubet. On 1 August, the Mediterranean Squadron departed for Toulon, arriving on 14 August.

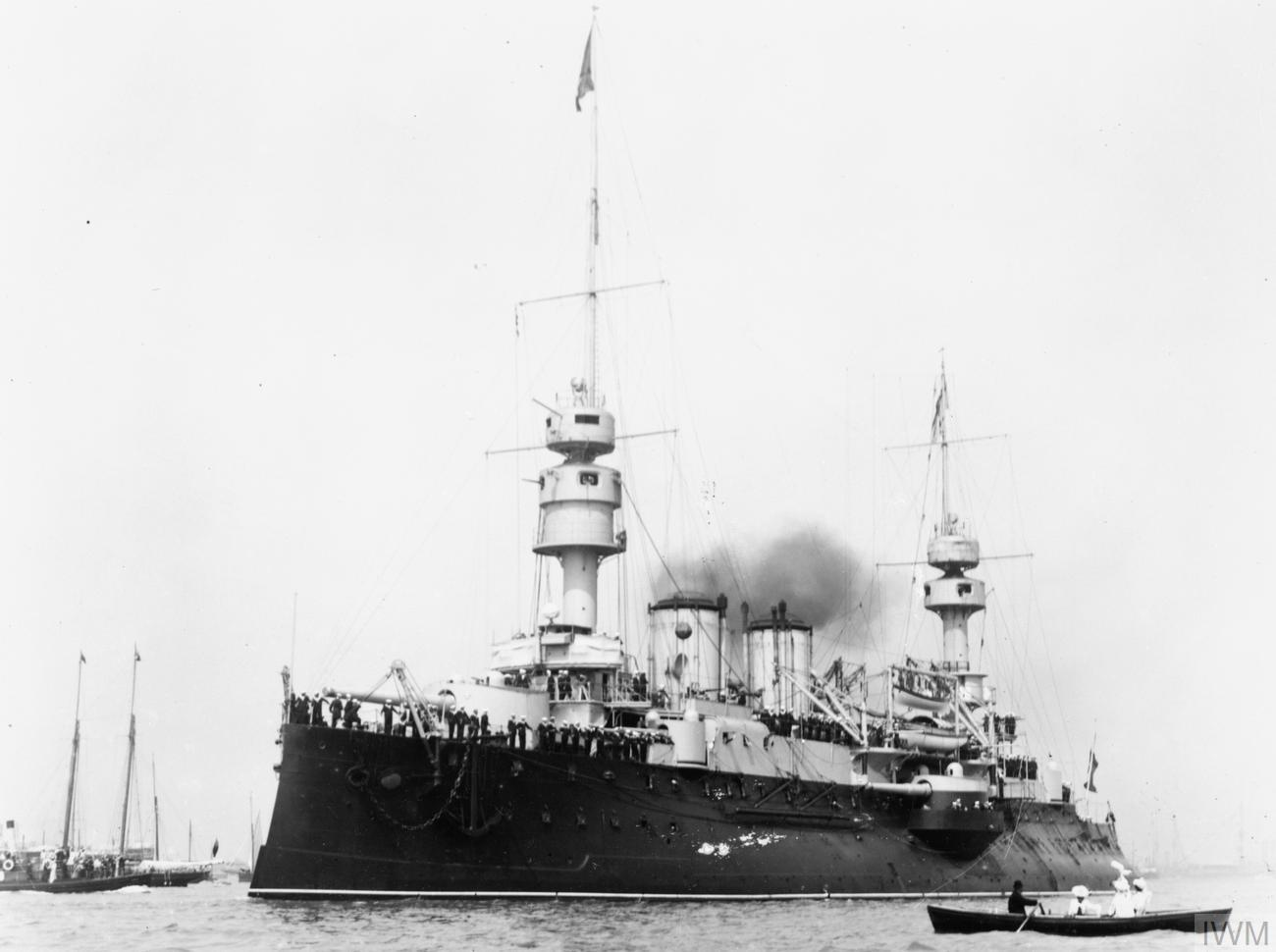
Jauréguiberry at Spithead in 1905

On 20 January 1902 the air chamber of another torpedo exploded, killing one sailor and wounding three. In September she transported the Minister of the Navy to Bizerte. By this time, the ship had been assigned to the 2nd Battle Division of the Mediterranean Squadron, along with Bouvet and the new battleship Iéna, the latter becoming the divisional flagship. In October, Jauréguiberry and the rest of the Mediterranean Squadron battleships steamed to Palma de Mallorca, and on the return to Toulon they conducted training exercises. Jauréguiberry was transferred to the Northern Squadron in 1904, her place in the Mediterranean Squadron being taken by the new battleship Suffren. Jauréguiberry arrived at Brest on 25 March. She was lightly damaged when she touched a rock while entering Brest in fog on 18 July and, in another incident, her steering compartment was flooded when a torpedo air chamber burst between her screws during a torpedo-launching exercise on 18 May 1905.

While visiting Portsmouth on 14 August, Jauréguiberry ran aground for a short time in the outer harbor. She returned to the Mediterranean Squadron in February 1907 where she was assigned to the Reserve Division, and the following year was reassigned to the 3rd Division. On 13 January 1908, she joined the battleships République, Patrie, Gaulois, Charlemagne, Saint Louis, and Masséna for a cruise in the Mediterranean, first to Golfe-Juan and then to Villefranche-sur-Mer, where the squadron stayed for a month. In 1909, the 3rd and 4th Divisions were reformed into the 2nd Independent Squadron and transferred to the Atlantic in 1910. Beginning on 29 September 1910 her boiler tubes were renewed in a four-month refit at Cherbourg. On 4 September 1911, she participated in a naval review off Toulon. In October 1912 the Squadron was reassigned to the Mediterranean Squadron and a year later, in October 1913, Jauréguiberry was transferred to the Training Division. During this period, she was fitted with an experimental fire-control system as part of a series of tests before it was installed in the new Courbet-class dreadnought battleships. She became the flagship of the Special Division in April 1914; in August, the commander of the division was Contre-amiral (Rear Admiral) Darrieus. At that time, the division also included the battleship Charlemagne and the cruisers Pothuau and D'Entrecasteaux.

=== World War I ===
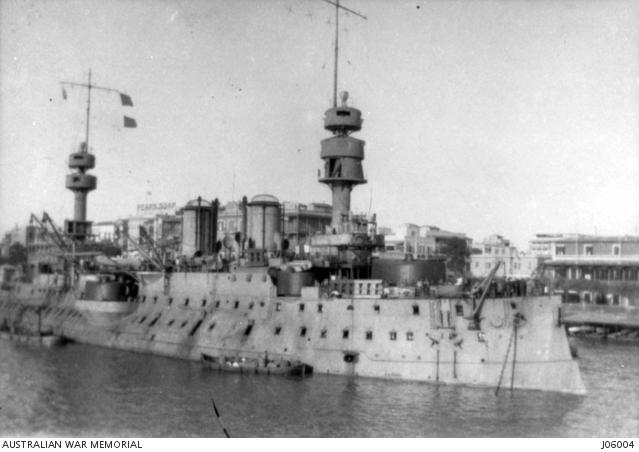
Jauréguiberry in Port Said in 1915

Following the outbreak of World War I in July 1914, France announced general mobilization on 1 August. The next day, Admiral Augustin Boué de Lapeyrère ordered the entire French fleet to begin raising steam at 22:15 so the ships could sortie early the next day. The bulk of the fleet, including the Division de complément, was sent to French North Africa, where they escorted the vital troop convoys carrying elements of the French Army from North Africa back to France to counter the expected German invasion. The French fleet was tasked with guarding against a possible attack by the German battlecruiser Goeben, which instead fled to the Ottoman Empire. As part of her mission, Jauréguiberry was sent to Oran, French Algeria on 4 August, in company with Bouvet, Suffren, and Gaulois. She also escorted a convoy of Indian troops passing through the Mediterranean in September. Beginning in December, Jauréguiberry was stationed at Bizerte, remaining there until February 1915 when she sailed to Port Said to become flagship of the Syrian Division, commanded by Admiral Louis Dartige du Fournet. At that time, the division included Saint Louis, the coast defence battleship Henri IV, and D'Entrecasteaux.

On 25 March, Jauréguiberry departed Port Said for the Dardanelles, where the French and British fleets were attempting to break through the Ottoman defenses guarding the straits. An earlier Anglo-French attack on 18 March had cost the French fleet the battleship Bouvet, and two other battleships—Suffren and Gaulois—had been badly damaged and forced to withdraw. To make good his losses, Admiral Émile Guépratte requested that Jauréguiberry and Saint Louis be transferred to his command. On 1 April, Guépratte transferred his flag from Charlemagne to Jauréguiberry. By late May, the French squadron had been restored to effective strength, and included the battleships Saint Louis, Charlemagne, Patrie, Suffren, and Henri IV. The formation was designated the 3rd Battle Division. Jauréguiberry provided gunfire support to the troops during the Landing at Cape Helles on 25 April, during which the French forces made a diversionary landing on the Asian side of the straits. During the operation, Jauréguiberry and the other French ships kept the Ottoman guns on that side of the strait largely suppressed, and prevented them from interfering with the main landing at Cape Helles. She continued operations in the area until 26 May, including supporting the Allied attack during the Second Battle of Krithia on 6 May. She was lightly damaged by Turkish artillery on 30 April and 5 May, but continued to fire her guns as needed.

Jauréguiberry was recalled to Port Said on 19 July and bombarded Ottoman-controlled Haifa on 13 August. She resumed her role as flagship of the Syrian Division on 19 August. The ship participated in the occupation of Ile Rouad on 1 September and other missions off the Syrian coast until she was transferred to Ismailia in January 1916 to assist in the defense of the Suez Canal, although she returned to Port Said shortly afterward. Jauréguiberry was refitted at Malta between 25 November and 26 December 1916, thereafter returning to Port Said. She landed some of her guns to help defend the canal in 1917 and was reduced to reserve in 1918. The ship arrived at Toulon on 6 March 1919 where she was decommissioned and transferred to the Engineer's Training School on 30 March for use as an accommodation hulk. She was struck from the Navy List on 20 June 1920, but remained assigned to the Engineer's School until 1932. Jauréguiberry was sold for scrap on 23 June 1934 for the price of 1,147,000 francs.
