= Italian ship Strale =

Strale is the name of at least three ships of the Italian Navy, and may refer to:

- Italian destroyer Strale (1900), a Lampo-class destroyer launched in 1900 and discarded in 1924.
- Italian destroyer Euro (1900), a Lampo-class destroyer launched in 1900 and renamed Strale shortly before being discarded in 1924.
- Italian destroyer Strale (1931), a Freccia-class destroyer launched in 1931 and sunk in 1942.
