= Italian destroyer Dardo (1900) =

Italian Lampo-class destroyer

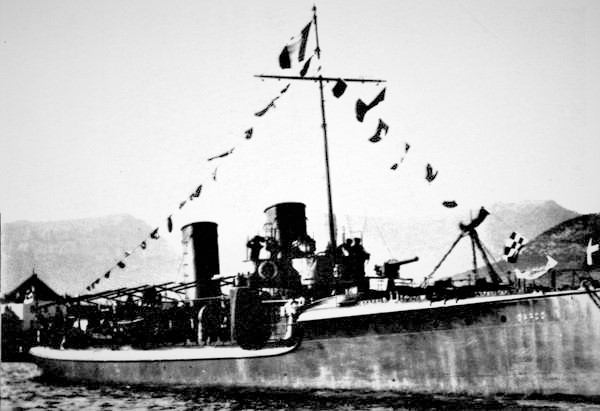
- Dardo dressed overall.

History

Kingdom of Italy
- Name: Dardo
- Namesake: Dart
- Builder: Schichau-Werke, Elbing, Germany
- Laid down: 17 August 1899
- Launched: 7 February 1900
- Completed: 16 March 1901
- Commissioned: March 1901
- Stricken: January or March 1920 (see text)
- Fate: Discarded 18 March 1920; Scrapped

General characteristics
- Type: Destroyer
- Displacement: 315 long tons (320 t) normal; 348 long tons (354 t) full load
- Length: 60.00 m (196 ft 10 in) pp; 62.05 m (203 ft 7 in) oa
- Beam: 6.50 m (21 ft 4 in)
- Draught: 2.60 m (8 ft 6 in)
- Propulsion: 2 × vertical triple-expansion steam engines; 4× Thornycroft boilers; 6,000 ihp (4,474 kW)
- Speed: 31 knots (57 km/h; 36 mph)
- Range: 290 nmi (540 km; 330 mi) at 26 knots (48 km/h; 30 mph); 2,000 nmi (3,700 km; 2,300 mi) at 12 knots (22 km/h; 14 mph)
- Complement: 59
- Armament: 1 × 76 mm (3 in)/40 gun; 5 × 57 mm/43; 2× 356 mm (14 in) torpedo tubes

Dardo ("Dart") was an Italian Lampo-class destroyer. Commissioned into service in the Italian Regia Marina (Royal Navy) in 1901, she served in the Italo-Turkish War and World War I. She was stricken in 1920.

== Construction and commissioning ==
Dardo was laid down at the Schichau-Werke in Elbing in the German Empire on 17 August 1899. She was launched on 7 February 1900 and completed on 16 March 1901. She was commissioned in March 1901.

Dardo and her five sister ships formed the first class of destroyers built for the Regia Marina, their only predecessor, Fulmine, having been a one-off. Designed by the German Schichau-Werke shipyard, they were seaworthy, robust, fast, and reliable, although they were afflicted by serious problems with seakeeping.

== Service history ==
=== Italo-Turkish War ===
Dardo participated actively in the Italo-Turkish War, which began on 29 September 1911 with the Kingdom of Italy′s declaration of war on the Ottoman Empire. At the outbreak of war, she was in reserve at Venice. On 13 November 1911 she conducted a reconnaissance of the Ottoman Libyan coast up to the border with French Tunisia, finding no smugglers but bombarding and damaging the Ottoman fort of Forona. On 17 November 1911 she opened fire on a group of Arabs near Zuwarah on the coast of Ottoman Tripolitania, putting them to flight. On 22 November 1911 she captured two boats loaded with supplies and ammunition off Zanzur on the coast of Ottoman Tripolitania, and on 27 November 1911 she bombarded and destroyed an Ottoman guard post in Falena in Ottoman Libya. In December 1911, she cooperated with the protected cruiser Liguria, the torpedo cruiser Partenope, and the destroyer Euro in attacking Ottoman positions at Zuwarah, Misrata, and Argub along the northwestern coast of Ottoman Tripolitania. The war ended on 18 October 1912 in an Italian victory.

=== 1913–1914 ===
On 29 January 1913, amid high political tension between Italy and the Ottoman Empire, Dardo escorted the battleships of the 1st Division (Regina Elena, Roma, and Vittorio Emanuele) from La Spezia to Augusta, Sicily. On 1 February 1913, she escorted the three battleships from Augusta to Syracuse, Sicily.

In August 1914, with the Principality of Albania shaken by revolts and inter-ethnic conflicts, Italy, which aimed to occupy strategic points on the Albanian coast, sent Dardo, under the command of Capitano di corvetta (Corvette Captain) Bernotti, and the torpedo cruiser Agordat to the Albanian port of Vlorë (known to the Italians as Valona), where they "showed the flag" and contributed to the protection of Albanian refugees from riots that broke out in the city. On 31 October 1914, Dardo brought Contrammiraglio (Counter Admiral) Patris to the Albanian island of Sazan (known to the Italians as Saseno), and Patris took possession of the island on behalf of the Kingdom of Italy.

=== World War I ===
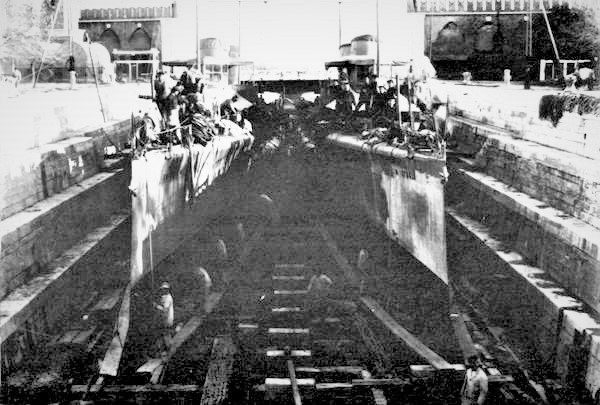
Dardo and her sister ship Strale in drydock.

World War I broke out in 1914, and the Kingdom of Italy entered the war on the side of the Allies with its declaration of war on Austria-Hungary on 23 May 1915. At the time, Dardo, still under Bernotti's command, Euro, and the destroyers Lampo, Ostro, and Strale made up the 4th Destroyer Squadron, under the command of Capitano di fregata (Frigate Captain) F. Gambardella. Dardo was based at Vlorë. By 1915, the Lampo-class destroyers were of antiquated design and had only limited military usefulness, but during World War I, they were modified, having equipment installed to carry and lay 12 mines, drop depth charges, and tow explosive paravanes. The Lampo-class ships spent the war on escort duty.

At the end of 1915, Dardo collided with the Italian submarine Velella, which suffered sigaificant damage and required drydocking for repairs.

Dardo continued her World War I service without taking part in any significant actions. By late October 1918, Austria-Hungary had effectively disintegrated, and the Armistice of Villa Giusti, signed on 3 November 1918, went into effect on 4 November 1918 and brought hostilities between Austria-Hungary and the Allies to an end. World War I ended a week later with an armistice between the Allies and the German Empire on 11 November 1918.

=== Post-World War I ===
Dardo was stricken from the naval register in either January or March 1924. She was discarded on 18 March 1920 and subsequently was scrapped.
