= Italian destroyer Lampo (1899) =

Italian Lampo-class destroyer

Lampo
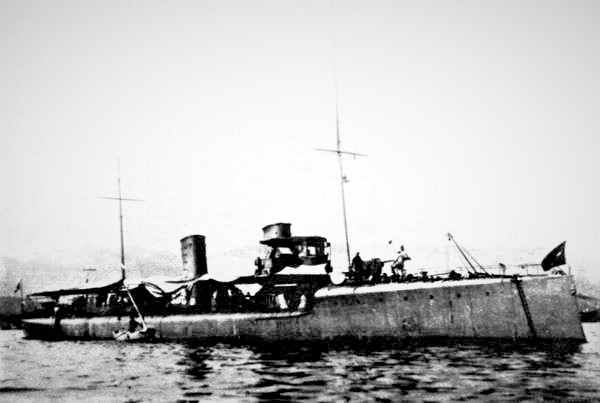

History

Kingdom of Italy
- Name: Lampo
- Namesake: Lightning
- Builder: Schichau-Werke, Elbing, Germany
- Laid down: 6 May 1899
- Launched: 7 October 1899
- Completed: 23 June 1900
- Commissioned: 23 June 1900
- Stricken: 18 March 1920
- Fate: Discarded 18 March 1920; Scrapped

General characteristics
- Type: Destroyer
- Displacement: 315 long tons (320 t) normal; 348 long tons (354 t) full load
- Length: 60.00 m (196 ft 10 in) pp; 62.05 m (203 ft 7 in) oa
- Beam: 6.50 m (21 ft 4 in)
- Draught: 2.60 m (8 ft 6 in)
- Propulsion: 2 × vertical triple-expansion steam engines; 4× Thornycroft boilers; 6,000 ihp (4,474 kW)
- Speed: 31 knots (57 km/h; 36 mph)
- Range: 290 nmi (540 km; 330 mi) at 26 knots (48 km/h; 30 mph); 2,000 nmi (3,700 km; 2,300 mi) at 12 knots (22 km/h; 14 mph)
- Complement: 59
- Armament: 1 × 76 mm (3 in)/40 gun; 5 × 57 mm/43; 2 × 356 mm (14 in) torpedo tubes

Lampo ("Lightning") was the lead ship of the Italian Lampo-class destroyers. Commissioned into service in the Italian Regia Marina (Royal Navy) in 1900, she served in the Italo-Turkish War and World War I. She was stricken in 1920.

== Construction and commissioning ==
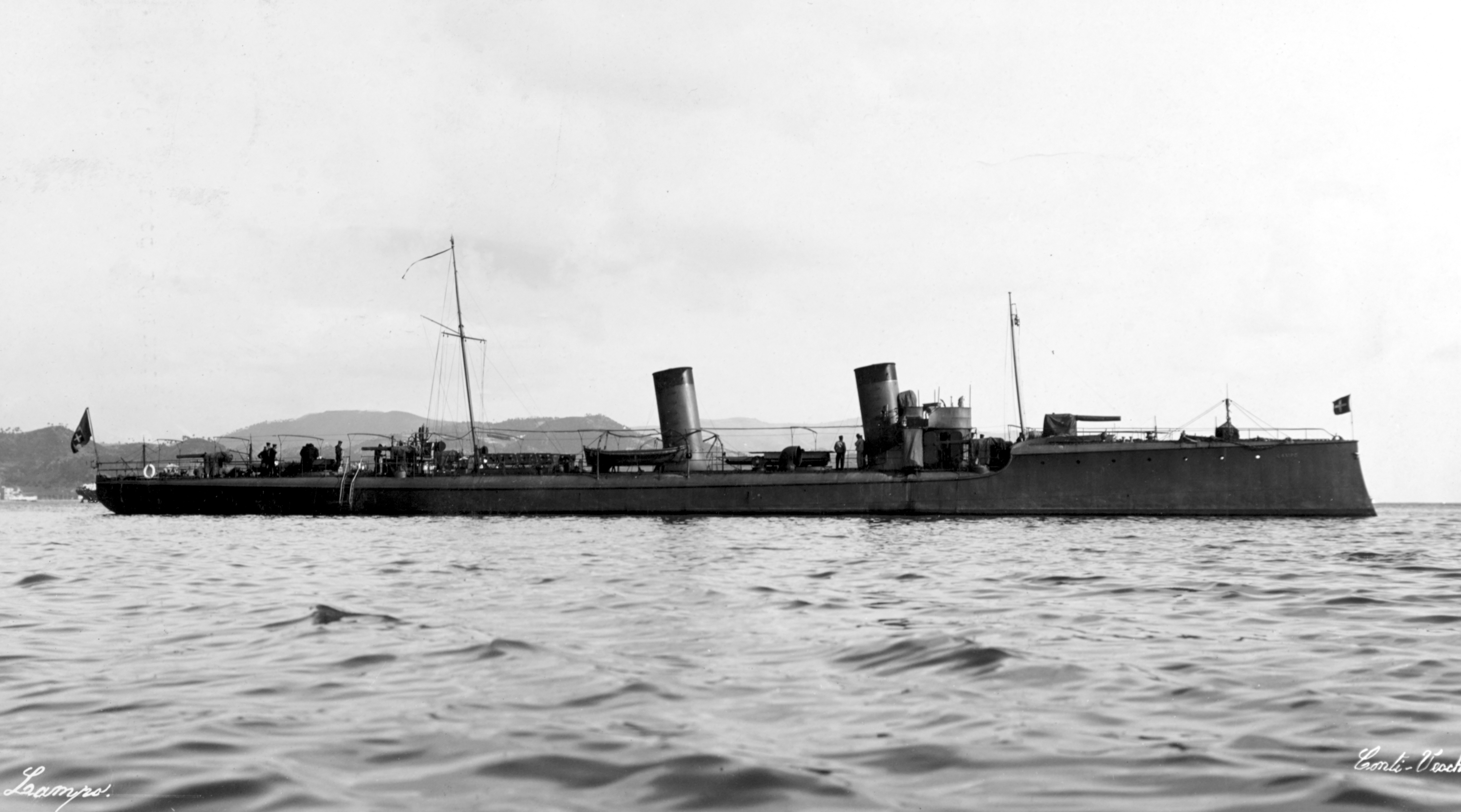
Lampo in March 1901 in the harbor at La Spezia, shortly after she arrived from the Schichau-Werke construction yard in Elbing, Germany.

Dardo was laid down at the Schichau-Werke in Elbing in the German Empire on 6 May 1899 as the lead ship the Lampo class destroyers. She was launched on 7 October 1899 and completed and commissioned on 23 June 1900.

Lampo and her five sister ships formed the first class of destroyers built for the Regia Marina, their only predecessor, Fulmine, having been a one-off. Designed by the German Schichau-Werke shipyard, they were seaworthy, robust, fast, and reliable, although they were afflicted by serious problems with seakeeping.

== Service history ==
=== Italo-Turkish War ===
Lampo participated actively in the Italo-Turkish War, which began on 29 September 1911 with the Kingdom of Italy′s declaration of war on the Ottoman Empire. At the outbreak of war, Lampo was part of the 2nd Squadron's 1st Division, which also included her sister ships Euro, Freccia, and Ostro. On 31 October 1911, she and the armored cruiser Carlo Alberto bombarded Ottoman-held Fort Hamidje, which had been shelling Italian positions at Tripoli in Ottoman Tripolitania, and silenced its guns. The war ended on 18 October 1912 in an Italian victory.

=== World War I ===
World War I broke out in 1914, and the Kingdom of Italy entered the war on the side of the Allies with its declaration of war on Austria-Hungary on 23 May 1915. At the time, Lampo, under the command of Capitano di corvetta (Corvette Captain) Castiglioni, Euro, Ostro, and their sister ships Dardo and Strale made up the 4th Destroyer Squadron, under the command of Capitano di fregata (Frigate Captain) F. Gambardella. Lampo and Ostro were based at Tripoli in Italian Tripolitania when Italy declared war.

By 1915, the Lampo-class destroyers were of antiquated design and had only limited military usefulness. During World War I, however, they were modified, having equipment installed to carry and lay 12 mines, drop depth charges, and tow explosive paravanes. The Lampo-class ships spent the war on escort duty.

Lampo took part in no significant actions during her World War I service. By late October 1918, Austria-Hungary had effectively disintegrated, and the Armistice of Villa Giusti, signed on 3 November 1918, went into effect on 4 November 1918 and brought hostilities between Austria-Hungary and the Allies to an end. World War I ended a week later with an armistice between the Allies and the German Empire on 11 November 1918.

=== Post-World War I ===
Lampo was stricken from the naval register on 18 March 1920. She was discarded the same day and subsequently was scrapped.

== See also ==
- List of destroyers of Italy
