= Italian ship Freccia =

Freccia was the name of at least three ships of the Italian Navy and may refer to:

- Italian destroyer Freccia (1899), a Lampo-class destroyer launched in 1899 and lost in 1911.
- Italian destroyer Freccia (1930), a Freccia-class destroyer launched in 1930 and sunk in 1943.
- Italian patrol boat Freccia (P 493), a patrol boat launched in 1965 and retired in 1984.
