= Italian destroyer Freccia (1899) =

Italian Lampo-class destroyer

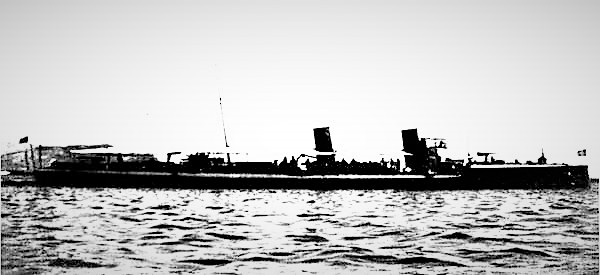

History

Kingdom of Italy
- Name: Freccia
- Namesake: Arrow
- Builder: Schichau-Werke, Elbing, Germany
- Laid down: 1899
- Launched: 23 November 1899
- Completed: 25 May 1902
- Commissioned: May 1902
- Fate: Wrecked 12 October 1911

General characteristics
- Type: Destroyer
- Displacement: 315 long tons (320 t) normal; 348 long tons (354 t) full load
- Length: 60.00 m (196 ft 10 in) pp; 62.05 m (203 ft 7 in) oa
- Beam: 6.50 m (21 ft 4 in)
- Draught: 2.60 m (8 ft 6 in)
- Propulsion: 2 × vertical triple-expansion steam engines; 4× Thornycroft boilers; 6,000 ihp (4,474 kW)
- Speed: 31 knots (57 km/h; 36 mph)
- Range: 290 nmi (540 km; 330 mi) at 26 knots (48 km/h; 30 mph); 2,000 nmi (3,700 km; 2,300 mi) at 12 knots (22 km/h; 14 mph)
- Complement: 59
- Armament: 1 × 76 mm (3 in)/40 gun; 5 × 57 mm/43; 2× 356 mm (14 in) torpedo tubes

Freccia ("Arrow") was an Italian Lampo-class destroyer. Commissioned into service in the Italian Regia Marina (Royal Navy) in 1902, she served in the Italo-Turkish War, during which she was wrecked in 1911.

== Construction and commissioning ==
Freccia was laid down at the Schichau-Werke in Elbing in the German Empire in 1899. She was launched on 23 November 1899 and completed on 25 May 1902. She was commissioned in May 1902.

Freccia and her five sister ships formed the first class of destroyers built for the Regia Marina, their only predecessor, Fulmine, having been a one-off. Designed by the German Schichau-Werke shipyard, they were seaworthy, robust, fast, and reliable, although they were afflicted by serious problems with seakeeping.

== Service history ==
Freccia participated in the Italo-Turkish War, which began on 29 September 1911 with the Kingdom of Italy′s declaration of war on the Ottoman Empire. At the outbreak of war, Freccia was part of the 2nd Squadron′s 1st Division, which also included her sister ships Euro, Lampo, and Ostro. By 30 September 1911, she was participating along with Euro, Ostro, the battleships Napoli and Roma, the armored cruisers Francesco Ferruccio, Giuseppe Garibaldi, and Varese, the torpedo cruiser Coatit, and the destroyers Garibaldino, Lanciere, and Strale in a blockade of Tripoli on the coast of Ottoman Tripolitania.

On 12 October 1911, a few days after Italian forces occupied Tripoli, Freccia struck rocks while attempting to leave Tripoli during a storm, then ran aground on a sandbank at the entrance of the port. Her entire crew survived, and initially the ship was considered to be in good condition and the Italians hoped to refloat her quickly. However, she sank by the bow a few days after running aground, coming to rest partially submerged. A steam launch struck the wreck on the evening of 21 October 1911, and damage to the wreck progressed until ultimately she was deemed beyond salvage.
