= Canon de 274 modèle 87/93 Glissement =

Canon de 274 modèle 87/93 à glissement
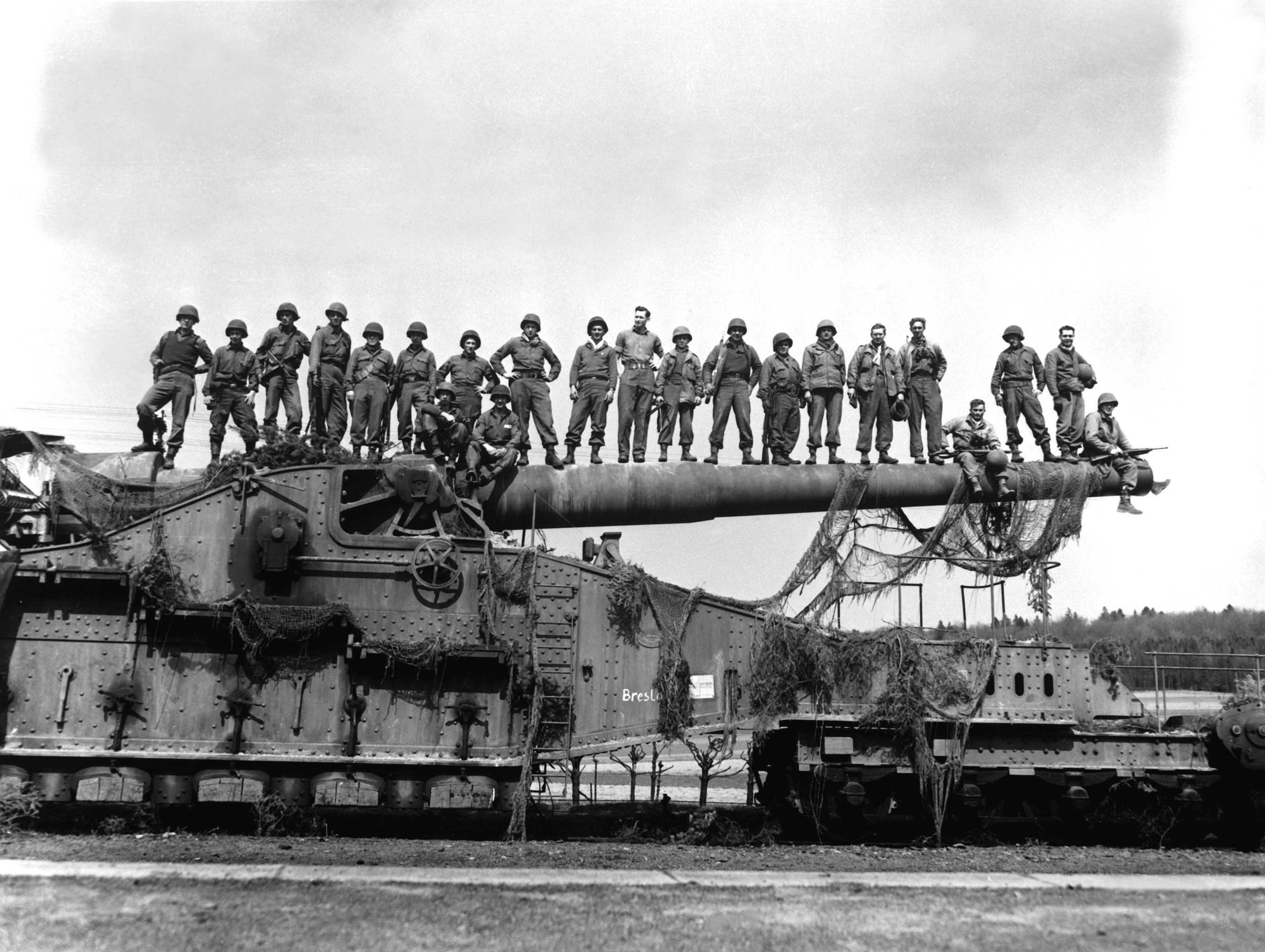
- A Canon de 274 modèle 87/93 captured by U.S. troops near Rentwertshausen 10 April 1945.
- Type: Railway gun
- Place of origin: France

Service history
- In service: 1917–1945
- Used by: France; Nazi Germany
- Wars: World War I World War II

Production history
- Designer: Schneider
- Designed: 1917
- Manufacturer: Schneider
- Produced: 1917
- No. built: 16

Specifications
- Mass: 155 t (153 long tons; 171 short tons)
- Length: 26 m (85 ft)
- Barrel length: 12.3 m (40 ft) L/45
- Shell: Separate loading bagged charge and projectile
- Shell weight: 216–255 kg (476–562 lb)
- Caliber: 274 mm (10.8 in)
- Breech: Interrupted screw breech
- Recoil: Sliding recoil mount
- Carriage: Two five-axle rail bogies
- Elevation: +5° to +40°
- Traverse: None
- Rate of fire: 1 round every four minutes
- Muzzle velocity: 790 m/s (2,600 ft/s)
- Effective firing range: 24 km (15 mi) at +40°
- Maximum firing range: 26.4 km (16.4 mi)

The Canon de 274 modèle 87/93 à glissement was a French Railway gun used by the French Army during World War I and World War II. The Germans captured a number after The Fall of France and operated them throughout the war.

== History ==
Although the majority of combatants had heavy field artillery prior to the outbreak of the First World War, none had adequate numbers of heavy guns in service, nor had they foreseen the growing importance of heavy artillery once the Western Front stagnated and trench warfare set in. Since aircraft of the period were not yet capable of carrying large diameter bombs the burden of delivering heavy firepower fell on the artillery. Two sources of heavy artillery suitable for conversion to field use were surplus coastal defense guns and naval guns.

However, a paradox faced artillery designers of the time; while large caliber naval guns were common, large caliber land weapons were not due to their weight, complexity, and lack of mobility. Large caliber field guns often required extensive site preparation because the guns had to be broken down into multiple loads light enough to be towed by a horse team or the few traction engines of the time and then reassembled before use. Building a new gun could address the problem of disassembling, transporting and reassembling a large gun, but it did not necessarily address how to convert existing heavy weapons to make them more mobile. Rail transport proved to be the most practical solution because the problems of heavy weight, lack of mobility and reduced setup time were addressed.

== Design ==
Influenced by the success and failures of the Canon de 274 modèle 93/96 Berceau the French Army decided to convert other large caliber guns to railway guns. Unlike the mle 93/96, the Canon de 274 modèle 87/93 Glissement did not have a carriage traversing mechanism, it did not have an armored cab for its gun crew and it had a sliding recoil carriage mount. Despite using a smaller propellant charge and having lower muzzle velocity than its predecessor the mle 87/93's greater angle of elevation +40° vs +25° gave it better range.

The mle 87/93 started life as Canon de 274 modèle 1887/1893 naval guns which were used as secondary armament on pre-dreadnought battleships such as the Bouvet and Masséna. The guns were typical built-up guns of the period with several layers of steel reinforcing hoops. The guns used an interrupted screw breech and fired separate loading bagged charges and projectiles. To load the gun the barrel lowered and a shell was brought forward by an elevated hoist to the rear of the carriage from an attached ammunition wagon.

The carriages consisted of a large rectangular steel base, which was suspended on two five-axle railroad bogies manufactured by Schneider. The number of axles was determined by the weight limit for European railways of 17 tonnes per axle. Since the carriage did not have a traversing mechanism it was aimed by drawing the guns across a section of curved track. Once in firing position, a section of rail bed was reinforced with wood and iron beams to support the weight of the gun. Six steel beams under the center of the carriage were then lowered to lay across the tracks and the carriage was jacked up to take weight off the bogies and anchor the gun in place. When the gun fired the entire carriage recoiled a few feet and was stopped by the friction of the beams on the tracks. The carriage was then lowered onto its axles and was either pushed back into place with a shunting locomotive or a windlass mounted on the front of the carriage pulled the carriage back into position. This cheap, simple and effective system came to characterize Schneider's railway guns during the later war years and is known as the Glissement system.

== World War I ==
The first four guns were completed by Schneider and delivered to the French Army during 1917. They saw heavy use and after 500 shots they were bored out to 285–288 mm (11.2–11.3 in) and provided with new ammunition. One 274 mm and two 285 mm guns were lost during the war.

== World War II ==
During 1919–1920 a number of new guns were finished and placed storage in case they were needed again. The guns were redesignated Canon de 274 modèle 1917 à glissement. At the outbreak of the Second World War France mobilized 16 mle 1887/93 guns. Four guns each were assigned to the 10th and 11th batteries of the Heavy Artillery Regiment 372° of the ALVF (Artillerie Lourde sur Voie Ferrée). Four guns each were assigned to the 4th battery of the Heavy Artillery Regiment 373° of the ALVF at Vendenheim and Kutzenhausen, France. While the 5th battery of the Heavy Artillery Regiment 373° of the ALVF may have been stationed at Mommenheim, France. After The Fall of France the Germans used six until the end of the war under the designations 27.4cm K(E) 591(f), 27.4cm K(E) 592(f) and 28.5cm K(E) 605(f).

== Ammunition ==
Ammunition was of separate loading type with a bagged charge and projectile. The charge weighed 67.6 kg (149 lb).

The guns were able to fire:

- Armor Piercing Capped - 255 kg (562 lb)
- Common Incendiary - 216 kg (476 lb)
- Semi-Armor Piercing Capped - 255 kg (562 lb)

== Photo Gallery ==
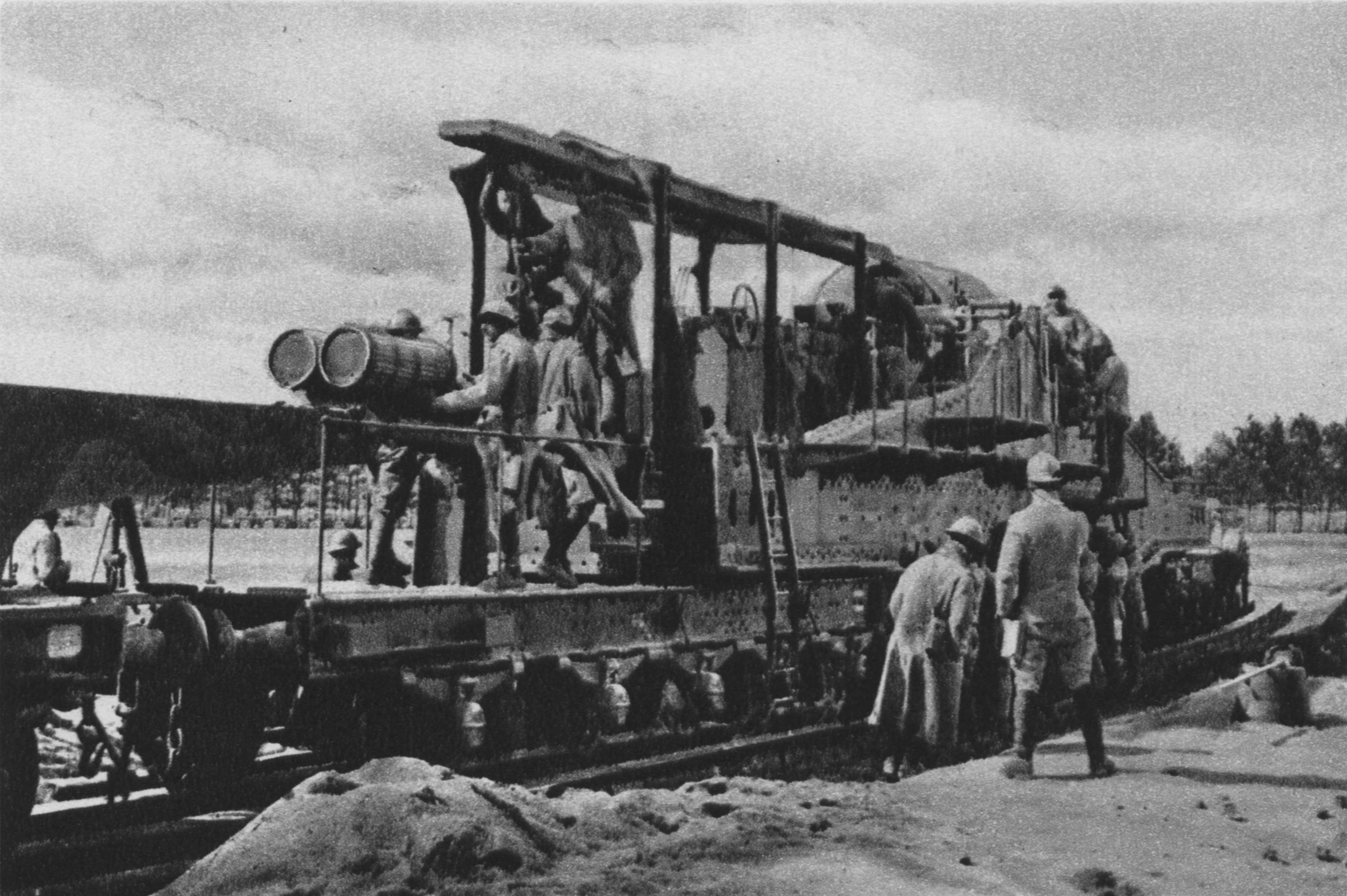
A mle 1887/93 in action during the First world war.

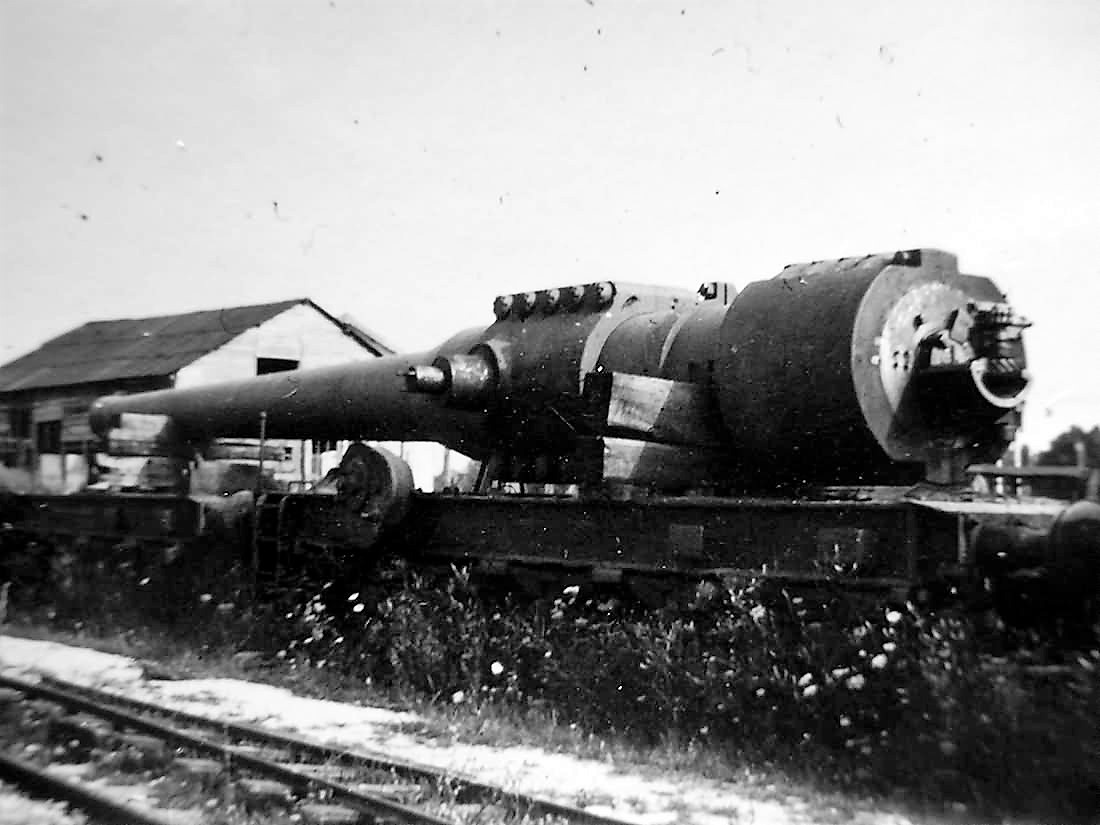
A mle 1887/93 barrel.

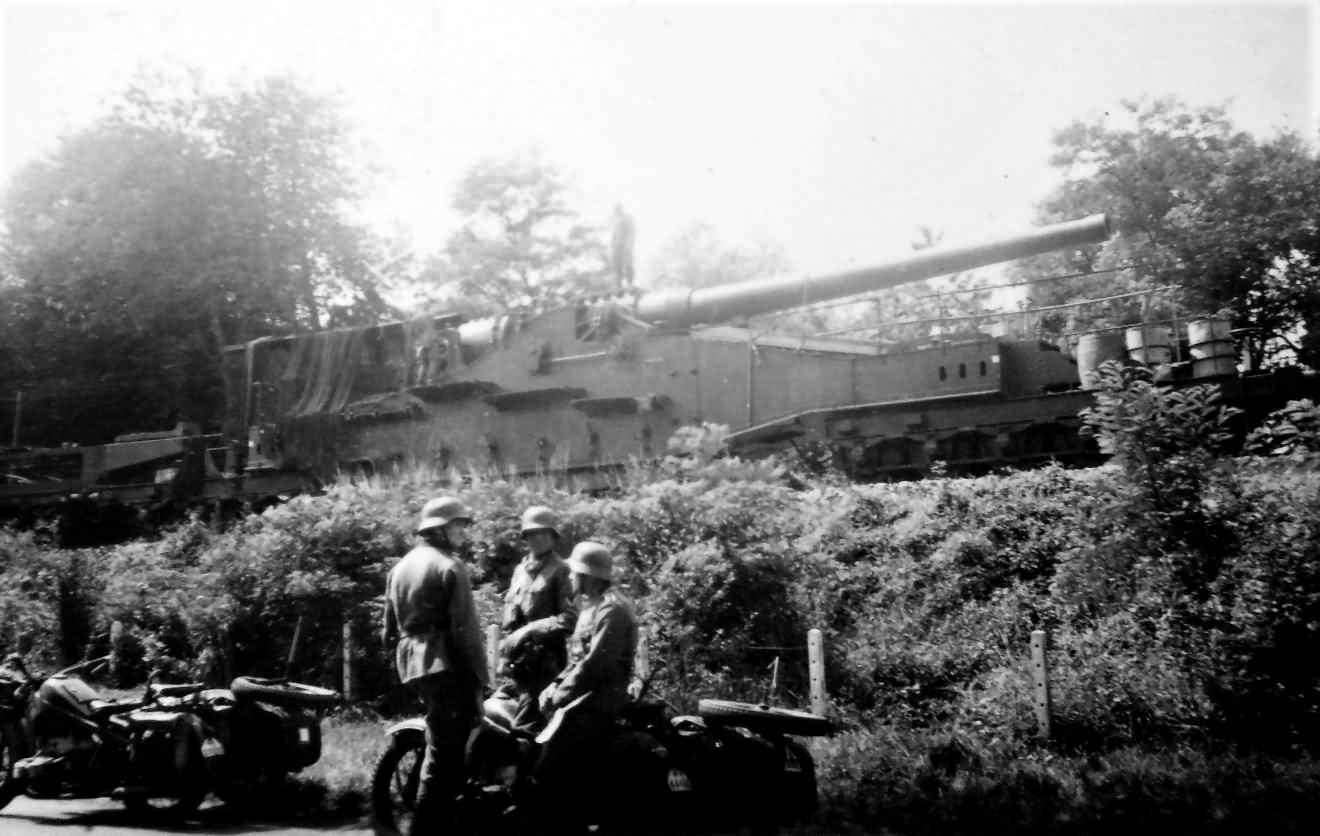
A mle 1887/93 captured by the Germans in 1940.

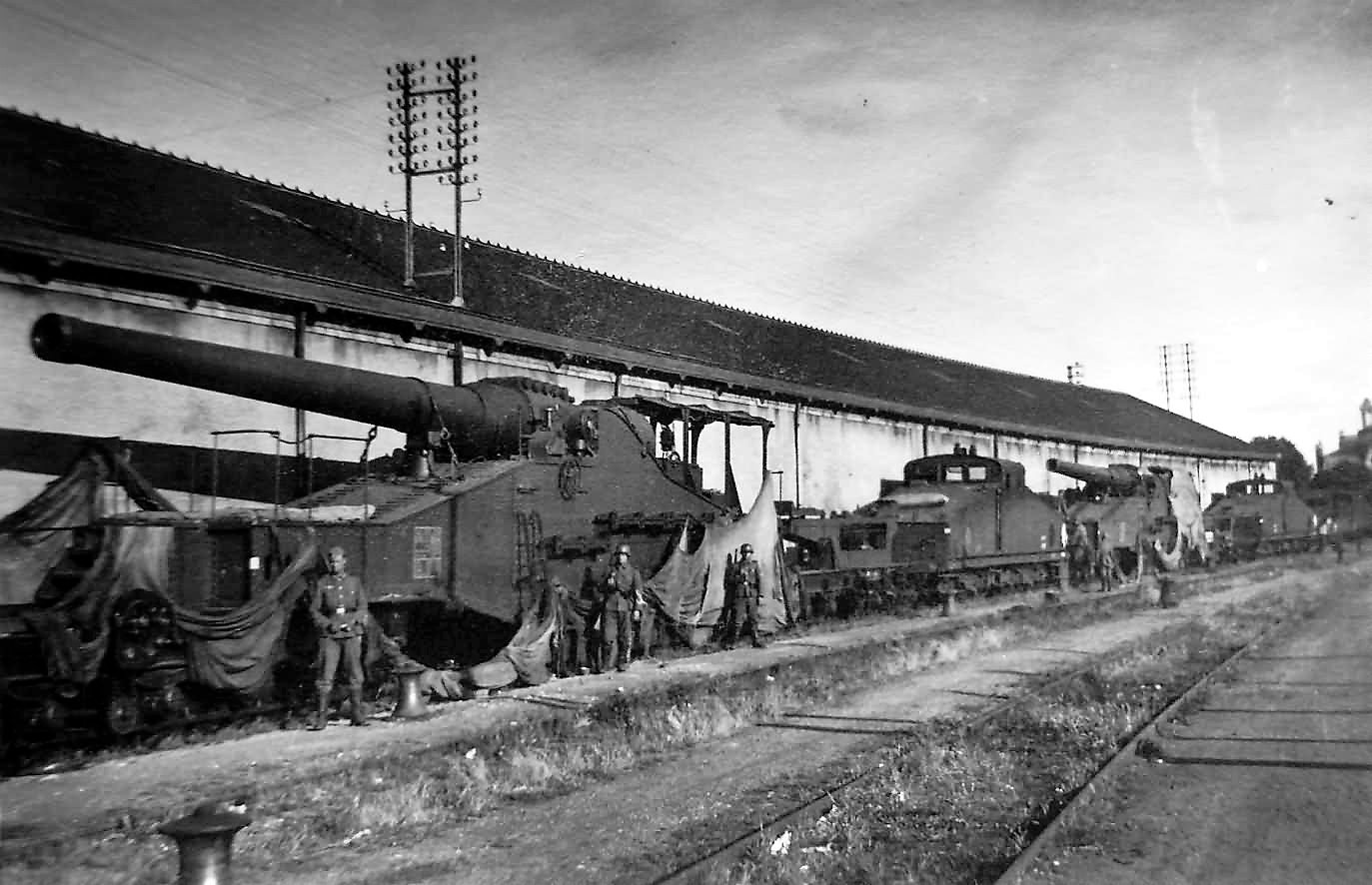
Two mle 1887/93 guns captured in a French depot in 1940.

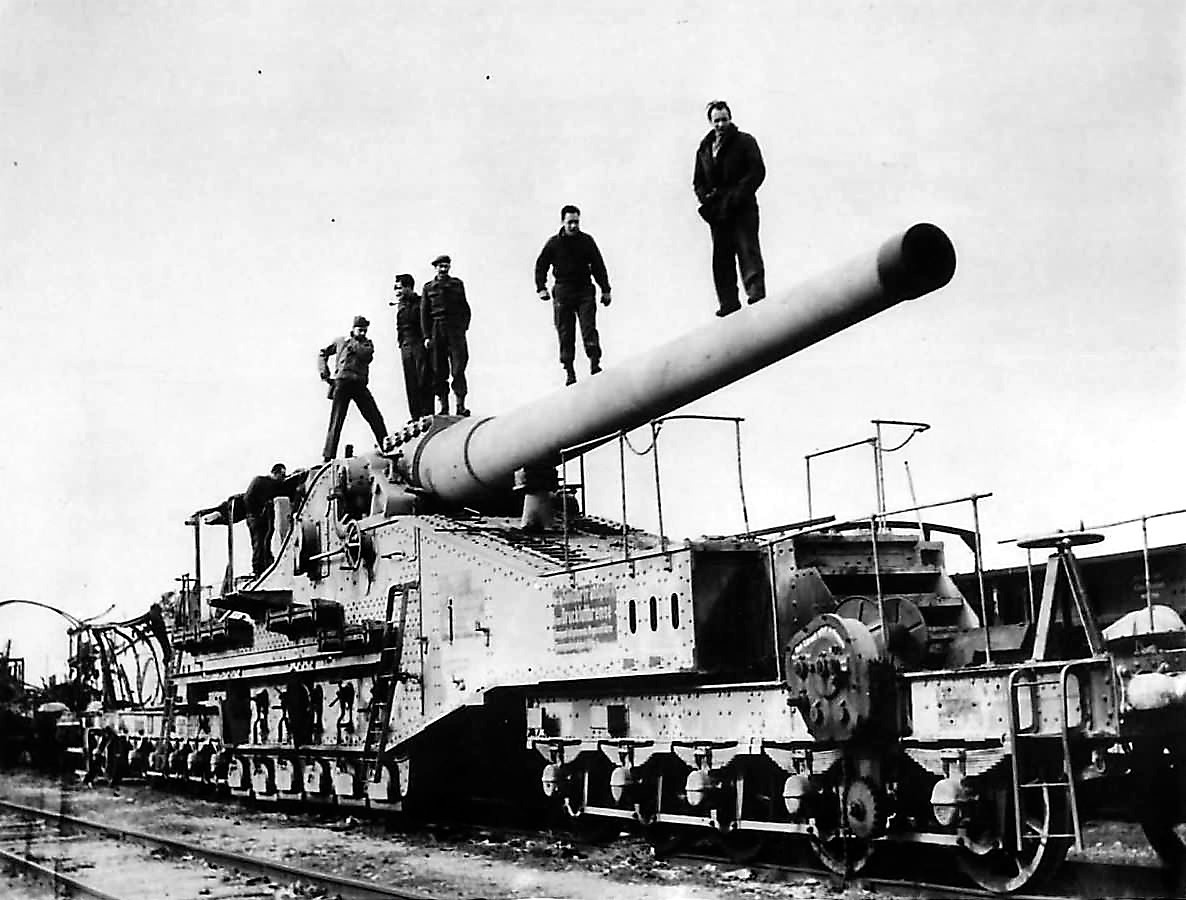
A mle 1887/93 captured by the US 7th Army Troops.
