= Freccia =

Freccia means Arrow in Italian and may refer to:

- 2 Cavalry Division Emanuele Filiberto Testa di Ferro, an Italian Army division known as the 134th Armoured Division Freccia during World War II
- Fiat G.50 Freccia, an Italian fighter aircraft of World War II
- Freccia (infantry fighting vehicle), a wheeled Italian infantry fighting vehicle
- Freccia-class destroyer of the Italian Navy
- Italian ship Freccia, various Italian naval ships
- Le Frecce, high-speed trains operated by Trenitalia in Italy

See also:

- Alfa Romeo, an Italian automobile known as La freccia rossa (The red arrow)
- Pietro Mennea, an Italian sprinter known as Freccia del Sud (Arrow of the South).
