= French battleship Henri IV =

Pre-dreadnought battleship of the French Navy

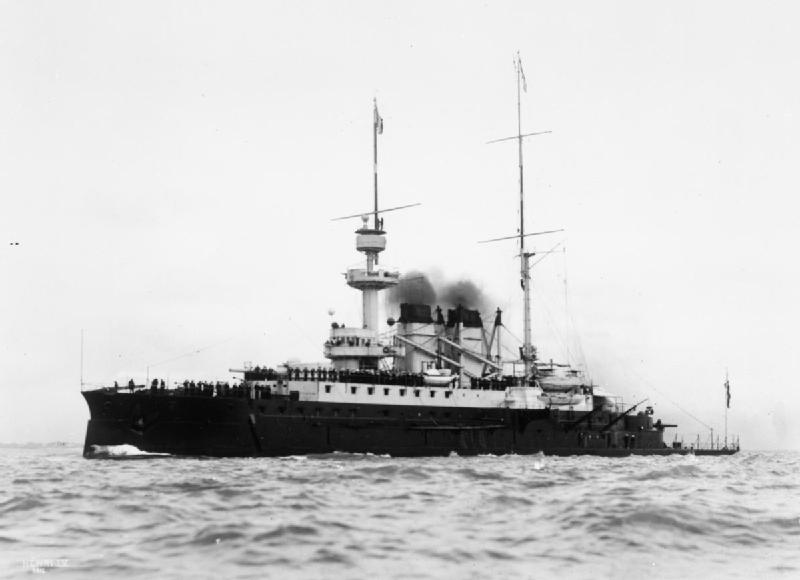
- Henri IV in 1905

History

France
- Name: Henri IV
- Namesake: Henry IV of France
- Builder: Arsenal de Cherbourg
- Cost: ₣15,660,000 francs
- Laid down: 15 July 1897
- Launched: 23 August 1899
- Commissioned: September 1903
- Stricken: 1920
- Fate: Scrapped, 1921

General characteristics
- Type: Pre-dreadnought battleship
- Displacement: 8,807 metric tons (8,668 long tons)
- Length: 108 m (354 ft 4 in)
- Beam: 22.2 m (72 ft 10 in)
- Draft: 7.5 m (24 ft 7 in)
- Installed power: 11,500 ihp (8,600 kW); 24 Niclausse boilers
- Propulsion: 3 shafts; 3 Vertical triple-expansion steam engines
- Speed: 17 knots (31 km/h; 20 mph)
- Range: 7,750 nmi (14,350 km; 8,920 mi) at 10 knots (19 km/h; 12 mph)
- Complement: 26 officers and 438 enlisted men
- Armament: 2 × 1 - Canon de 274 modèle 1893/1896 guns; 7 × 1 - 138.6 mm (5.46 in) Mle 1893 guns; 12 × 1 - 47 mm (1.9 in) Mle 1885 Hotchkiss guns; 2 × 450 mm (17.7 in) torpedo tubes
- Armor: Belt: 180–280 mm (7.1–11.0 in); Decks: 60 mm (2.4 in); Ammunition shafts: 240 mm (9.4 in); Turrets: 270–110 mm (10.6–4.3 in)

Henri IV was a pre-dreadnought battleship of the French Navy built to test some of the ideas of the prominent naval architect Louis-Émile Bertin. She began World War I as guardship at Bizerte. She was sent to reinforce the Allied naval force in the Dardanelles campaign of 1915, although some of her secondary armament had been removed for transfer to Serbia in 1914. Afterwards, she was relegated to second-line roles before being sent to Taranto as a depot ship in 1918. She was struck from the navy list in 1920 and scrapped the following year.

== Design ==
Henri IV was designed by the famous French naval architect Louis-Émile Bertin to evaluate some of his ideas. She was designed to make her a small target and lacked most of the normal rear superstructure common to ships of her period, other than that needed to keep her rear turret from being washed out. Her rear hull had only 4 feet (1.2 m) of freeboard, although she was built up to the normal upper deck height amidships and at the bow for better sea-keeping and to provide for her crew. Her superstructure was narrow and recessed from the hull above the main deck.

=== General characteristics ===
Henri IV was smaller than her predecessors, at 108 metres (354 ft 4 in) overall. She had a beam of 22.2 metres (72 ft 10 in) and a maximum draft of 7.5 metres (24 ft 7 in). She was significantly lighter than the Charlemagne-class battleships and displaced only 8,948 metric tons (8,807 long tons) normally, some 2,300 metric tons (2,260 long tons) less than the earlier ships. Her crew consisted of 26 officers and 438 enlisted men.

=== Propulsion ===
Henri IV had three vertical triple-expansion steam engines, each driving one propeller shaft. The engines were rated at 11,500 indicated horsepower (8,600 kW) using steam provided by 24 Niclausse boilers and gave a top speed of 17 knots (31 km/h; 20 mph). She carried a maximum of 1,100 tonnes (1,080 long tons; 1,210 short tons) of coal that gave her a range of 7,750 nautical miles (14,350 km; 8,920 mi) at a speed of 10 knots (19 km/h; 12 mph).

=== Armament ===
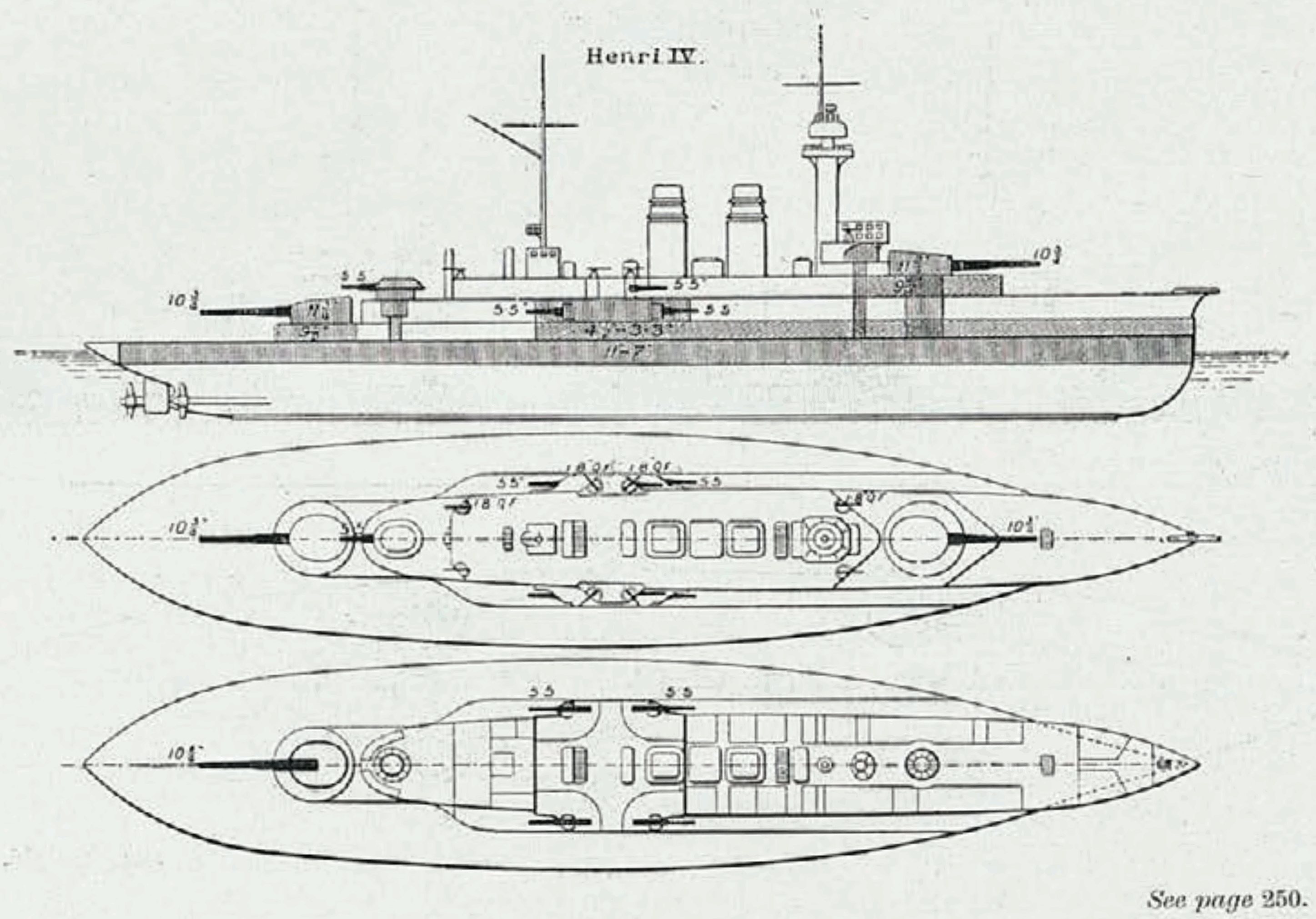
Armament and armor diagram of the ship in the 1904 issue of The Naval Annual

Henri IV carried her main armament of two 40-caliber 274 mm (10.8 in) Canon de 274 modèle 1893/1896s in two single-gun turrets, one forward on the upper deck and the other on the main deck at the rear. The guns fired 255 kg (562 lb) armor-piercing projectiles at a muzzle velocity of 865 metres per second (2,840 ft/s).

The ship's secondary armament consisted of seven 45-caliber 138.6 mm (5.46 in) Canon de 138 mm Modèle 1893 naval guns. Four were mounted in individual casemates on the main deck; two more were mounted on the shelter deck with gun shields and the last gun was mounted in a shelter deck turret superfiring over the rear main gun turret. This was the first superfiring turret in naval history and, in this case, was not very successful because the barrel of the 138 mm gun was too short to clear the sighting hood of the turret below. These guns fired 35–30 kg (77–66 lb) shells at muzzle velocities of 730–770 metres per second (2,400–2,500 ft/s).

Twelve 47 mm (1.9 in) 40-caliber Canon de 47 mm Modèle 1885 Hotchkiss guns were mounted as anti-torpedo boat guns. They were mounted in platforms in the foremast and mainmast and on the superstructure. They fired a 1.49-kilogram (3.3 lb) projectile at 610 metres per second (2,000 ft/s) to a maximum range of 4,000 metres (4,400 yd). Their theoretical maximum rate of fire was fifteen rounds per minute, but only seven rounds per minute sustained. Two submerged 450 mm (18 in) torpedo tubes were also carried. Exactly which types of torpedoes carried is unknown, but most of the torpedoes in service during the war had warheads of 110 kilograms (240 lb), maximum speeds of 36 knots (67 km/h; 41 mph) and maximum ranges of 6,000 meters (6,600 yd).

=== Armor ===
Henri IV had a waterline armor belt of Harvey armor that was 2.5 m (8.2 ft) high and tapered from the maximum thickness of 280 mm (11 in) that to 180 mm (7.1 in) at the ship's ends. The belt ended short of the stern in a 100 mm (3.9 in) traverse bulkhead. The lower edge of this belt tapered as well from 180 to 75 mm (7.1 to 3.0 in) in thickness. The upper armor belt was mostly 100 mm (3.9 in) thick and ran from the bow to 9.1 m (360 in) aft of the midsection. It was generally 2 m (6.6 ft) high, but increased to 4 m (13 ft) forward and ended in a 75 mm (3.0 in) traverse bulkhead. The maximum thickness of the armored deck was 60 mm (2.4 in), but tapered to 30 mm (1.2 in) at the ship's ends. Below this was a thinner armored deck that tapered from 20 mm (0.79 in) on the centerline to 35 mm (1.4 in) at the edges. It curved down about 91 cm (36 in) to form a torpedo bulkhead before it met up with the inner bottom. This system was based on experiments conducted in 1894 and was more modern than that used in the Russian battleship Tsesarevich although it was still too close to the side of the ship. The main turret armor was 305 mm (12.0 in) in thickness and the ammunition shafts were protected by 240 mm (9.4 in) of armor. The casemates for the 138 mm guns ranged from 75–115 mm (3.0–4.5 in) in thickness and their ammunition tubes had 164.7 mm (6.48 in) of armor.

== Construction and service ==
Henri IV was laid down at Cherbourg on 15 July 1897 and launched on 23 August 1899, but did not enter service until September 1903, at a cost of ₣15,660,000 francs. By 1911, Henri IV was assigned as the guard ship of the French naval base in Tunis in French Tunisia. After the Italian destroyer Fulmine stopped and thoroughly searched the French mail steamer Favignano for contraband on 25 January 1912 during the Italo-Turkish War, Henri IV and four French torpedo boats deployed from Bizerte to the southeastern border of Tunisia to stop contraband traffic between Tunisia and the Ottoman Empire and enforce France's obligations as a neutral country.

The ship spent the early part of World War I as the guard ship at Bizerte until February 1915, when she was assigned to the newly formed Syrian Squadron (Escadre de Syrie). This squadron was intended to attack Ottoman positions and lines of communication in Syria, Lebanon, Palestine, and the Sinai Peninsula. Henri IV was transferred to the French squadron in the Dardanelles campaign to replace the sunken battleship Bouvet and the damaged Gaulois after the Allies suffered heavily during their first attempt to steam through the Dardanelles and past the fortifications on 18 March 1915. The ship bombarded Kum Kale, on the Asiatic side of the Dardanelles in support of the French diversionary landing on 25 April 1915, and provided fire support for the troops ashore for the rest of the month. She was hit eight times while providing support during this time.

Three of her 138.6-millimetre (5.46 in) guns had been dismounted by November 1914 and sent by rail from Salonica to reinforce the French naval mission to Serbia, known as "Mission D". In 1916, she was assigned to the Complementary (Reserve) Division of the 3rd Battle Squadron. Subsequently she served with the French Eastern Division in Egypt and then she was sent to Taranto in 1918 to serve as a depot ship. Henri IV was stricken from the Navy List in 1920 and scrapped in 1921.
