= Italian destroyer Ostro (1901) =

Italian Lampo-class destroyer

Ostro
History

Kingdom of Italy
- Name: Ostro
- Namesake: The ostro, a Mediterranean wind
- Builder: Schichau-Werke, Elbing, Germany
- Laid down: 23 March 1900
- Launched: 9 February 1901
- Commissioned: 8 December 1901
- Stricken: September 1920
- Fate: Discarded 30 September 1920; Scrapped

General characteristics
- Type: Destroyer
- Displacement: 315 long tons (320 t) normal; 348 long tons (354 t) full load
- Length: 60.00 m (196 ft 10 in) pp; 62.05 m (203 ft 7 in) oa
- Beam: 6.50 m (21 ft 4 in)
- Draught: 2.60 m (8 ft 6 in)
- Propulsion: 2 × vertical triple-expansion steam engines; 4× Thornycroft boilers; 6,000 ihp (4,474 kW)
- Speed: 31 knots (57 km/h; 36 mph)
- Range: 290 nmi (540 km; 330 mi) at 26 knots (48 km/h; 30 mph); 2,000 nmi (3,700 km; 2,300 mi) at 12 knots (22 km/h; 14 mph)
- Complement: 59
- Armament: 6 × 57 mm/43; 2 × 356 mm (14 in) torpedo tubes

Ostro ("Ostro") was an Italian Lampo-class destroyer. Commissioned into service in the Italian Regia Marina (Royal Navy) in 1901, she served in the Italo-Turkish War and World War I. She was stricken in 1920.

== Construction and commissioning ==
Ostro was laid down at the Schichau-Werke in Elbing in the German Empire on 23 March 1900. She was launched on 9 February 1901 and completed on 8 December 1901. She was commissioned in December 1901.

== Service history ==
=== Italo-Turkish War ===
The Italo-Turkish War began on 29 September 1911 with the Kingdom of Italy′s declaration of war on the Ottoman Empire. At the outbreak of war, Ostro was part of the 2nd Squadron's 1st Division, which also included her sister ships Euro, Freccia, and Lampo. At 05:00 on 18 April 1912 Ostro and the battleship Emanuele Filiberto arrived at Vathy on the island of Samos in the eastern Aegean Sea and without warning attacked the Ottoman military installations there, destroying a barracks that housed 1,200 men and some artillery batteries and forcing the garrison to surrender. The Italians claimed that Ostro torpedoed and sank an Ottoman Navy gunboat, identified as Ircanich or Ixanié by various sources, although the Ottomans claimed that the gunboat's crew scuttled her. The Italian ships departed immediately after the gunboat sank.

On 2 May 1912, Ostro and the battleship Regina Margherita conducted a diversionary action which included various attacks along the coast of Rhodes to distract the Ottoman garrison there while the Italians prepared an amphibious landing at Calitea. On either 7 or 28 May 1912, according to different sources, Ostro captured the former wali (Ottoman governor) of Rhodes — who also was the wali of the Dodecanese — in the harbor at Lindos, which the Italians had occupied two days earlier, just as he was about to depart Lindos. The war ended on 18 October 1912 in an Italian victory.

=== World War I ===
World War I broke out in 1914, and the Kingdom of Italy entered the war on the side of the Allies with its declaration of war on Austria-Hungary on 23 May 1915. At the time, Ostro, under the command of Capitano di corvetta (Corvette Captain) Castiglioni, Euro, Lampo, and their sister ships Dardo and Strale made up the 4th Destroyer Squadron, based in Tripoli in Italian Tripolitania under the overall command of Capitano di fregata (Frigate Captain) F. Gambardella. By 1915, the Lampo-class destroyers were of antiquated design and had only limited military usefulness, but during World War I they were modified, having equipment installed to carry and lay 12 mines, drop depth charges, and tow explosive paravanes.

The presence of Ostro and Euro in the harbor at Durrës (known to the Italians as Durazzo) on the coast of the Principality of Albania in late December 1916 prompted the Austro-Hungarian Navy to raid the harbor on 29 December 1916 in an attempt to attack them during the Adriatic campaign. The two destroyers had left by the time the Austro-Hungarian raid took place and thus escaped damage, although the Austro-Hungarians sank the only ships that were present in the harbor, the Greek steamship Mikael and two sailing ships.

By late October 1918, Austria-Hungary had effectively disintegrated, and the Armistice of Villa Giusti, signed on 3 November 1918, went into effect on 4 November 1918 and brought hostilities between Austria-Hungary and the Allies to an end. World War I ended a week later with an armistice between the Allies and the German Empire on 11 November 1918.

=== Post-World War I ===
Stricken from the naval register in September 1920, Ostro was discarded on 30 September 1920. She subsequently was scrapped.
