= Canon de 274 modèle 1893/1896 =

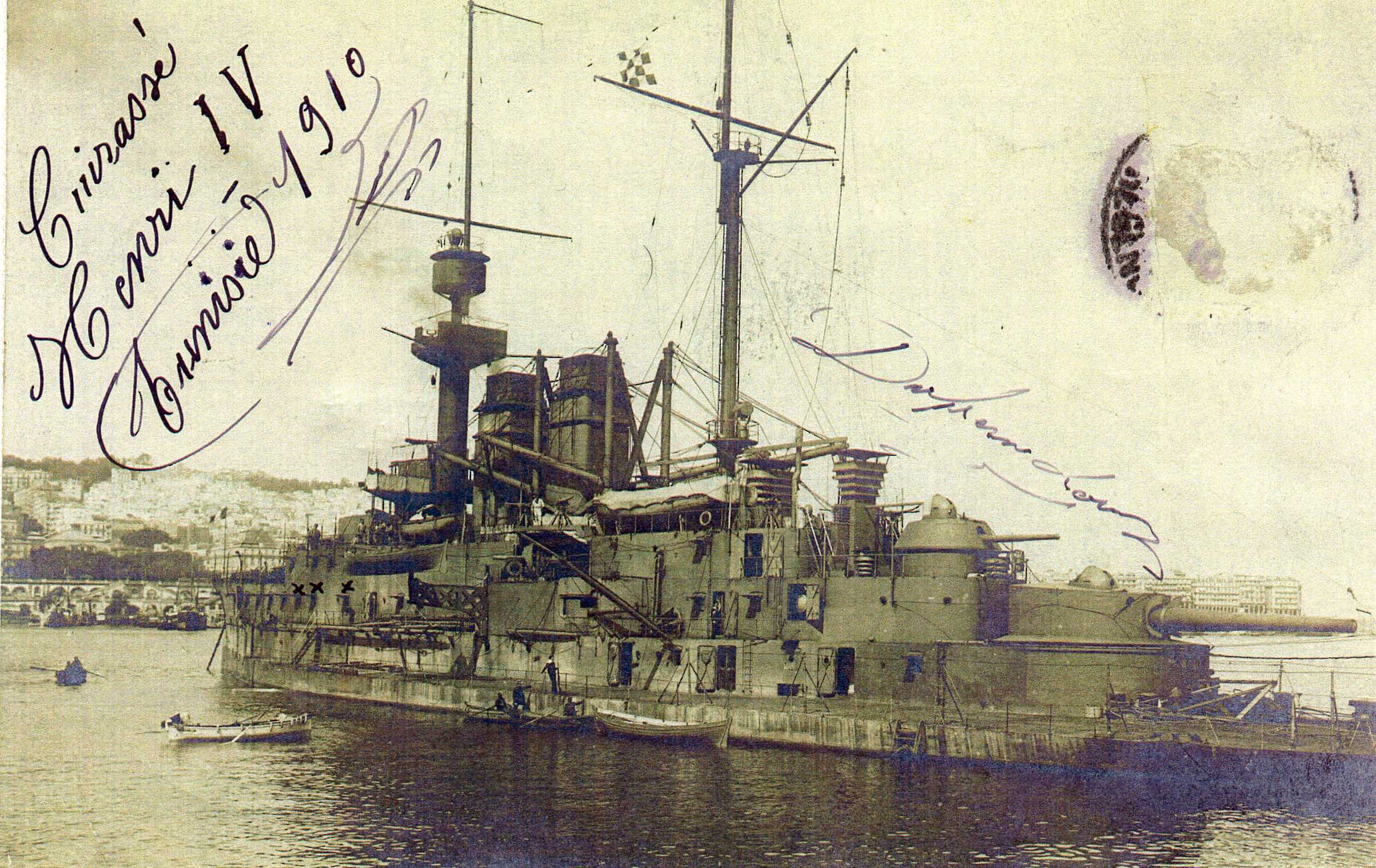
- A photo showing the stern turret on the French battleship Henri IV.
- Type: Naval gun Coastal artillery Railway artillery
- Place of origin: France

Service history
- In service: 1894-?
- Used by: France
- Wars: World War I

Production history
- Designed: 1893
- Produced: 1894

Specifications
- Mass: 35 t (34 long tons; 39 short tons)
- Barrel length: 11.5 m (37 ft 9 in) L/40
- Shell: Separate loading bagged charge and projectile
- Shell weight: 216–255 kg (476–562 lb)
- Caliber: 274 mm (10.8 in)
- Breech: Interrupted screw
- Elevation: -10° to +25°
- Traverse: -150° to +150°
- Rate of fire: 3 rpm
- Muzzle velocity: 865–915 m/s (2,840–3,000 ft/s)
- Maximum firing range: 23–29.5 km (14.3–18.3 mi) at +25°

The Canon de 274 modèle 1893/1896 were a family of French naval guns developed in the years before World War I that armed a variety of warships of the French Navy. Guns salvaged from scrapped ships found a second life as coastal artillery and railway artillery during World War I.

== Design ==
The mle 1893/1896 guns were typical built-up guns of the period with several layers of steel reinforcing hoops. The guns used an interrupted screw breech and fired separate loading bagged charges and projectiles. They were shorter and lighter than the preceding Canon de 274 modèle 1887/1893 and despite being shorter they used a larger propellant charge which gave them higher muzzle velocity and range than their predecessors.

== Naval Use ==
Mle 1893/1896 guns armed coastal defense ships, ironclads and pre-dreadnoughts of the French Navy built or refit between 1887-1905.

Coastal defense ships

- Terrible Class - Three ships of this class the Caïman, Indomptable, and Requin received two single mount mle 1893/1896 guns during refits in 1901.

Ironclads

- Redoutable - This ship received three mle 1893/1896 guns in single mounts after an 1894 refit.

Pre-dreadnoughts

- Henri IV - The primary armament of this ship consisted of two mle 1893/1896 guns in single turrets fore and aft of the ship's superstructure.

== Railway guns ==
During World War I four guns were removed from Caïman and Indomptable and converted by Schneider to railway guns. These were designated Canon de 274 modèle 93/96 Berceau and they were widely used. When their barrels were worn they were bored out to 285–288 mm (11.2–11.3 in) and given new ammunition.

== Ammunition ==
Ammunition was of separate loading type with a bagged charge and projectile. The charge weighed 85 kg (187 lb).

The guns were able to fire:

- Armor Piercing Capped - 255 kg (562 lb)
- Common Incendiary - 216 kg (476 lb)
- Semi-Armor Piercing Capped - 255 kg (562 lb)

== Bibliography ==
- Friedman, Norman (2011). Naval Weapons of World War One. Barnsley, South Yorkshire, UK: Seaforth. ISBN 978-1-84832-100-7.
