= Italian submarine F10 =

Italian Navy submarine of 1916–1930

- F10 at Brindisi, Italy, in 1917.

History

Italy
- Name: F10
- Builder: FIAT-San Giorgio, La Spezia, Italy
- Laid down: 31 August 1915
- Launched: 19 October 1916
- Commissioned: 29 December 1916
- Decommissioned: 2 June 1930
- Identification: Pennant number F10
- Fate: Scrapped

General characteristics
- Class & type: F-class submarine
- Displacement: 262 long tons (266 t) (surfaced); 319 long tons (324 t) (submerged)
- Length: 45.6 m (149 ft 7 in) (overall); 45.1 m (148 ft 0 in) (between perpendiculars)
- Beam: 4.2 m (13 ft 9 in)
- Draught: 3.1 m (10 ft 2 in)
- Propulsion: 2 × 670 bhp (500 kW) Fiat diesel engines; 2 × 500 hp (373 kW) Savigliano electric motors; 2 x shafts; 15 tons diesel fuel
- Speed: 12.5 knots (23.2 km/h; 14.4 mph) (surfaced); 8.2 knots (15.2 km/h; 9.4 mph) (submerged)
- Range: 1,600 nmi (3,000 km; 1,800 mi) at 8.5 knots (15.7 km/h; 9.8 mph) (surfaced); 80 nmi (150 km; 92 mi) at 4 knots (7.4 km/h; 4.6 mph) (submerged)
- Test depth: 45 metres (148 feet)
- Complement: 26 (2 officers, 24 men)
- Armament: 2 × 450 mm (17.7 in) torpedo tubes (2 bow); 4 x torpedoes; 1 × 76 mm (3 in) deck gun
- Notes: SOURCE:

F10 was an F-class submarine in commission in the Italian Regia Marina (Royal Navy) from 1916 to 1930. She took part in World War I, conducting antisubmarine patrols in the Mediterranean Sea during the Mediterranean U-boat campaign and seeing service in the Adriatic Campaign.

== Construction and commissioning ==
F10 was laid down by FIAT-San Giorgio at La Spezia, Italy, on 31 August 1915. She was launched on 19 October 1916 and commissioned on 29 December 1916.

== Service history ==
Upon F10′s commissioning, the Italian Regia Marina (Royal Navy) assigned her to antisubmarine patrol duty in the northern Tyrrhenian Sea during the Mediterranean U-boat campaign of World War I.

In March 1917, F10 was transferred to the Brindisi Submarine Squadron and her sister ship F9 was reassigned to the 1st Submarine Squadron at Venice, and the two submarines set out on their transfer voyage in company. During their voyage, they were involved in a friendly fire incident on 11 March when the Italian destroyer Euro and torpedo boat Airone mistook them for Central Powers submarines and opened fire on them off Messina, Sicily. The two submarines quickly submerged and avoided damage.

After her arrival at Brindisi, F10 operated in the Adriatic Sea, taking part in the Adriatic Campaign. In October 1917, she moved to Vlorë (known to the Italians as Valona) in the Principality of Albania, where she engaged in defensive patrols to protect that base. In March 1918, F10 transferred to the 1st Submarine Squadron in Venice, from which she conducted patrols along the coast of Dalmatia and off Trieste and Pola. By the time World War I ended in November 1918, F10 had conducted 32 war patrols, but without noteworthy results.

After World War I, F10 continued to operate in the Adriatic Sea, participating in maneuvers and conducting training cruises. She was decommissioned on 2 June 1930. She subsequently was scrapped.
