= SS Minas (1891) =

Italian troopship

History

Kingdom of Italy
- Name: Minas
- Builder: Gio. Ansaldo & C., Sestri Ponente, Italy
- Launched: 1891
- Fate: Sunk 15 February 1917

General characteristics
- Type: Passenger ship
- Tonnage: 2,854 gross register tons
- Length: 110.90 metres (363 ft 10 in)
- Beam: 12.22 metres (40 ft 1 in)
- Propulsion: Steam engine
- Speed: 12 knots (22 km/h; 14 mph)
- Capacity: 60 first-class passengers; 900 third-class passengers

SS Minas was an Italian troopship which was sunk on 15 February 1917 in the Central Mediterranean Sea with the loss of 870 lives.

== Construction, characteristics, and civilian service ==
SS Minas was a passenger ship built in 1891 by Gio. Ansaldo & C. in Sestri Ponente, Italy, and operated by Angelo Parodi fu B. of Genoa. She was 110.90 metres (363 ft 10 in) long and 12.22 metres (40 ft 1 in) in beam and had a top speed of 12 knots (22 km/h; 14 mph). She could carry 60 passengers in first class and 900 in third class. Prior to Italy's entry into World War I in 1915, she travelled mainly between Genoa and South America.

== Loss ==
Italy entered World War I on the side of Allies in May 1915, and Minas was requisitioned for use as a troopship. On 15 February 1917, she was in the Mediterranean Sea, steaming from Taranto, Italy, to Salonika, Greece, carrying Italian, Serbian, and French soldiers as well as weapons and ammunition to the Salonika front under escort by the Italian Regia Marina ("Royal Navy") destroyer Fulmine. The Allies had divided the Mediterranean into separate zones, in each of which one of the major Allied navies (the Regia Marina, the French Navy, and the British Royal Navy) had the responsibility for escort duty. Upon reaching the boundary between the Italian and British escort zones about 200 nautical miles (370 km; 230 mi) east of Malta, Fulmine parted company with Minas, but due to a mix-up no British warship arrived to escort Minas. Minas continued her voyage unescorted, and later on 15 February the Imperial German Navy submarine U-39, under the command of Walter Forstmann, attacked her in the Central Mediterranean east of Cape Matapan, hitting her with two torpedoes. Minas′s cargo of ammunition exploded, and she sank very quickly at 36°25′N 018°24′E with the loss of 870 lives. Eleven crew members and 315 Italian soldiers were among the dead. Among the killed were the only Serbian general killed in action during World War 1 Ilija Gojković, some accounts state he was machine gunned on a lifeboat by the surfaced submarine while firing his revolver at her, and the Italian soldier Vittorio Locchi, a young Florentine poet, who had written The Feast of Santa Gorizia in 1916. It was also rumored that the ship carried 25 boxes of gold bullion.
