= Canon de 274 modèle 93/96 Berceau =

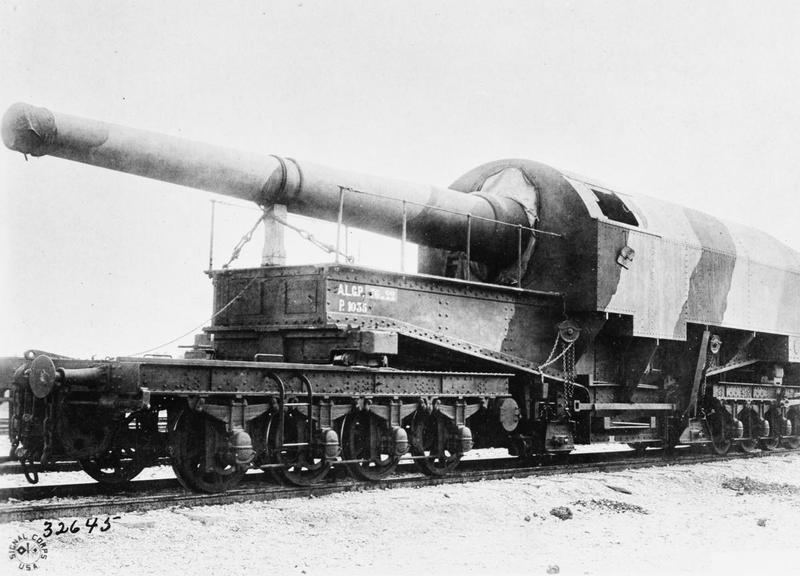
- Type: Railway gun
- Place of origin: France

Service history
- In service: 1915-?
- Used by: France
- Wars: World War I

Production history
- Designer: Schneider
- Designed: 1915
- Manufacturer: Schneider
- Produced: 1915
- No. built: 4

Specifications
- Barrel length: 11.5 m (37 ft 9 in) L/40
- Shell: Separate loading bagged charge and projectile
- Shell weight: 216–255 kg (476–562 lb)
- Caliber: 274 mm (10.8 in)
- Breech: Interrupted screw breech
- Recoil: Cradle recoil
- Carriage: Two four-axle rail bogies
- Elevation: 0 to +25°
- Traverse: -1° to +1° left/right Car traversing mount
- Rate of fire: 1 round every five minutes
- Muzzle velocity: 865–915 m/s (2,840–3,000 ft/s)
- Maximum firing range: 22 km (14 mi) at +25°

The Canon de 274 modèle 93/96 Berceau was a French Railway gun used by the French Army during World War I.

== History ==
Although the majority of combatants had heavy field artillery prior to the outbreak of the First World War, none had adequate numbers of heavy guns in service, nor had they foreseen the growing importance of heavy artillery once the Western Front stagnated and trench warfare set in. Since aircraft of the period were not yet capable of carrying large diameter bombs the burden of delivering heavy firepower fell on the artillery. Two sources of heavy artillery suitable for conversion to field use were surplus coastal defense guns and naval guns.

However, a paradox faced artillery designers of the time; while large caliber naval guns were common, large caliber land weapons were not due to their weight, complexity, and lack of mobility. Large caliber field guns often required extensive site preparation because the guns had to be broken down into multiple loads light enough to be towed by a horse team or the few traction engines of the time and then reassembled before use. Building a new gun could address the problem of disassembling, transporting and reassembling a large gun, but it did not necessarily address how to convert existing heavy weapons to make them more mobile. Rail transport proved to be the most practical solution because the problems of heavy weight, lack of mobility and reduced setup time were addressed.

== Design ==
The Canon de 274 modèle 93/96 Berceau started life as Canon de 274 modèle 1893/1896 naval guns from two coastal defense ships of the Terrible Class called the Caïman and Indomptable. When these ships were disarmed four of their guns were converted to railway guns. The guns were typical built-up guns of the period with several layers of steel reinforcing hoops. The guns used an interrupted screw breech and fired separate loading bagged charges and projectiles.

The carriages consisted of a large rectangular steel base, which was suspended on two four-axle railroad bogies manufactured by Schneider. The number of axles was determined by the weight limit for European railways of 17 tonnes per axle. Rather than having a separate ammunition wagon the guns featured a one- piece design where the breach of the gun and its ammunition were combined in an armored cab on the rear bogie. This was intended to give the gun crews protection from shell splinters and gunfire but the cab was cramped and lacked ventilation. This also restricted the angle of elevation to +25° and limited the range of the guns to 22 km (14 mi).

To load the gun the barrel lowered and a shell was brought forward by an elevated hoist within the cab. For large angles of traverse, the guns were pushed across a curved section of track for aiming. For small corrections, the guns had car traversing or "berceau" system which allowed 1° of left/right traverse by slewing the rear of the carriage on its bogies. The guns had a hydro-pneumatic cradle recoil system where the cradle recoiled up a slightly inclined rear deck which helped return the gun to battery after firing. Once in firing position, a section of rail bed was reinforced with wooden beams to support the weight of the gun. Two steel beams under the center of the carriage were then lowered and the carriage was jacked up to take weight off the bogies and anchor the gun in place. The carriage also had a windlass towards the front of the carriage that would draw the carriage back into position after firing if the gun had moved. The success of the conversion led to the conversion of other large caliber naval guns such as the earlier Canon de 274 modèle 1887/1893. However, the armored cab, carriage traverse, and cradle recoil were not repeated in future Schneider railway guns. Instead, most used simpler and less costly "glissement" carriages with better angles of elevation and greater range.

== World War I ==
The first guns were completed by Schneider and delivered to the French Army during the summer of 1915. They saw heavy use and when their barrels were worn they were bored out to 285–288 mm (11.2–11.3 in) and provided with new ammunition.

== Ammunition ==
Ammunition was of separate loading type with a bagged charge and projectile. The charge weighed 85 kg (187 lb).

The guns were able to fire:

- Armor Piercing Capped - 255 kg (562 lb)
- Common Incendiary - 216 kg (476 lb)
- Semi-Armor Piercing Capped - 255 kg (562 lb)

== Photo Gallery ==
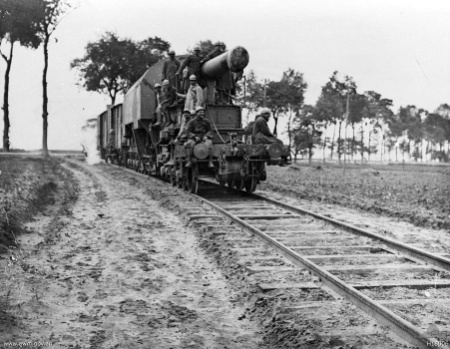
A 274 mm mle 93/96 in traveling position.

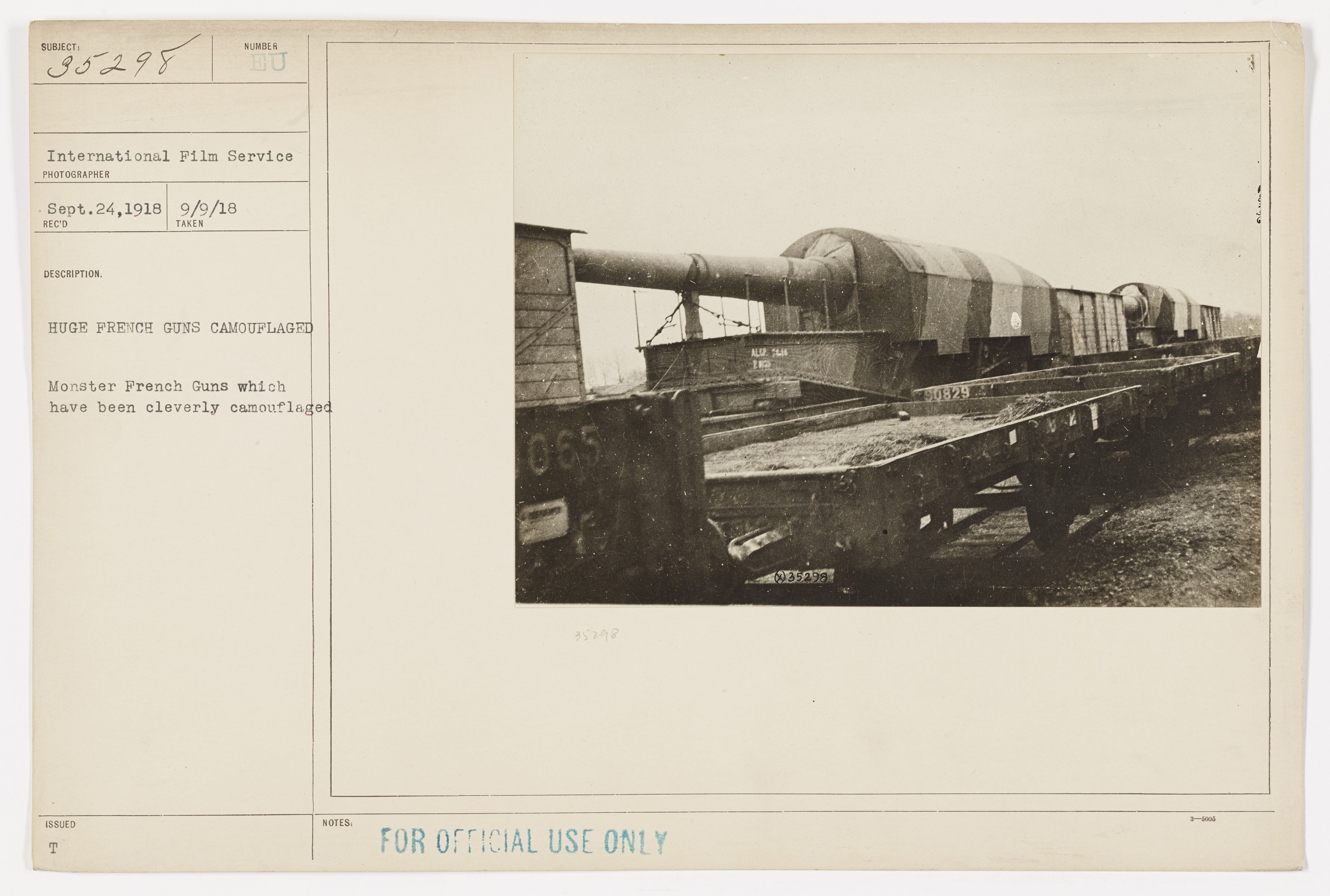
Two 274 mm mle 93/96 guns in traveling position.

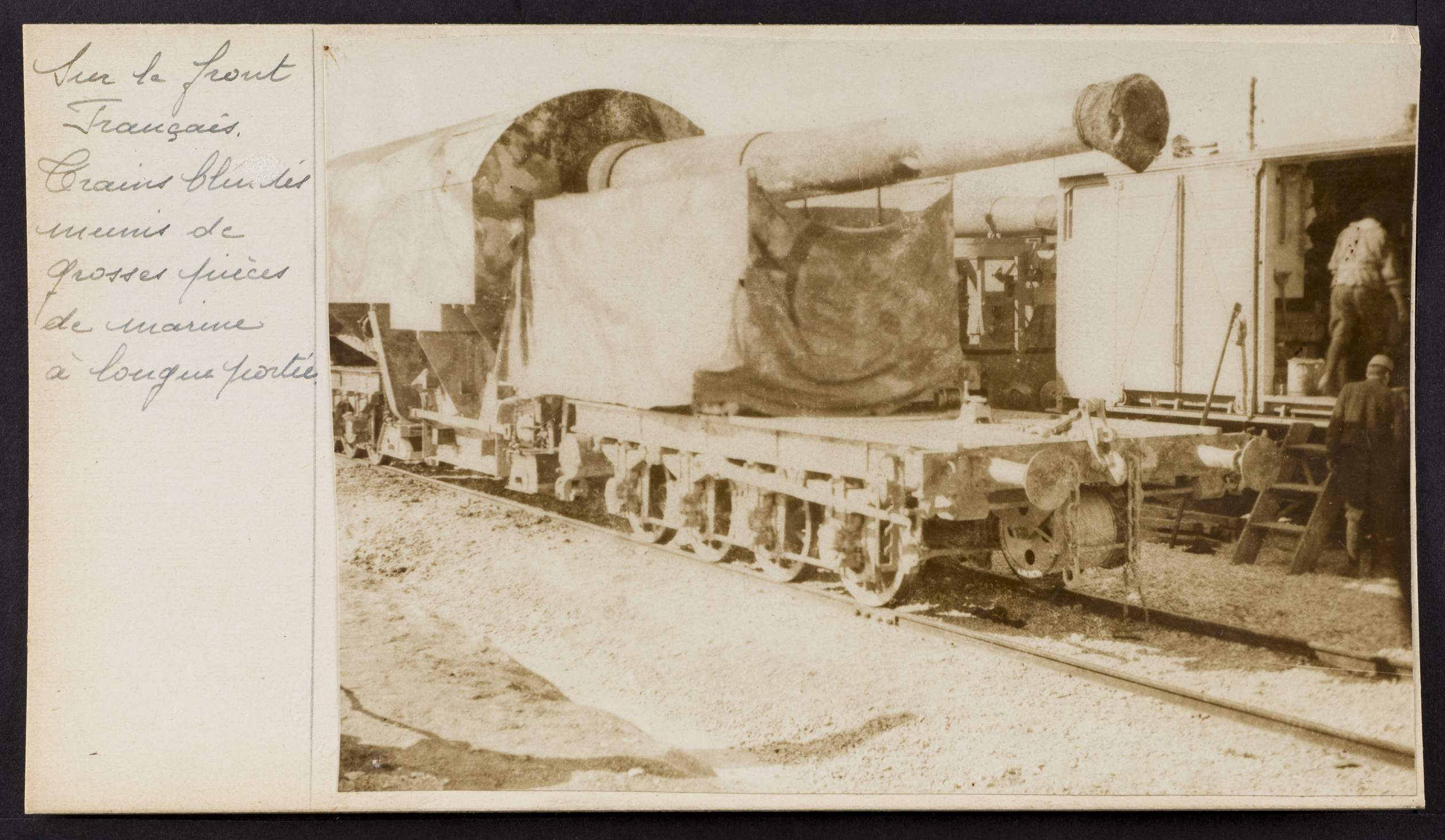
