= Italian submarine F9 =

Italian Navy submarine of 1916–1930

History

Italy
- Name: F9
- Builder: FIAT-San Giorgio, La Spezia, Italy
- Laid down: 3 June 1915
- Launched: 24 September 1916
- Commissioned: 29 December 1916
- Decommissioned: 1 August 1928
- Identification: Pennant number F9
- Motto: Ubi Mars atrocissimus adsum (Where Mars is most ferocious, I am there)
- Fate: Scrapped

General characteristics
- Class & type: F-class submarine
- Displacement: 262 long tons (266 t) (surfaced); 319 long tons (324 t) (submerged)
- Length: 45.6 m (149 ft 7 in) (overall); 45.1 m (148 ft 0 in) (between perpendiculars)
- Beam: 4.2 m (13 ft 9 in)
- Draught: 3.1 m (10 ft 2 in)
- Propulsion: 2 × 670 bhp (500 kW) Fiat diesel engines; 2 × 500 hp (373 kW) Savigliano electric motors; 2 x shafts; 15 tons diesel fuel
- Speed: 12.5 knots (23.2 km/h; 14.4 mph) (surfaced); 8.2 knots (15.2 km/h; 9.4 mph) (submerged)
- Range: 1,600 nmi (3,000 km; 1,800 mi) at 8.5 knots (15.7 km/h; 9.8 mph) (surfaced); 80 nmi (150 km; 92 mi) at 4 knots (7.4 km/h; 4.6 mph) (submerged)
- Test depth: 45 metres (148 feet)
- Complement: 26 (2 officers, 24 men)
- Armament: 2 × 450 mm (17.7 in) torpedo tubes (2 bow); 4 x torpedoes; 1 × 76 mm (3 in) deck gun
- Notes: SOURCE:

F9 was an F-class submarine in commission in the Italian Regia Marina (Royal Navy) from 1916 to 1928. She took part in World War I, conducting antisubmarine patrols in the Mediterranean Sea during the Mediterranean U-boat campaign and seeing service in the Adriatic Campaign.

== Construction and commissioning ==
F9 is launched at Muggiano, La Spezia, Italy, on 24 September 1916.

F9 was laid down by FIAT-San Giorgio at Muggiano, La Spezia, Italy, on 3 June 1915. She was launched on 24 September 1916 and commissioned on 29 December 1916.

== Service history ==
After F9 completed workups, the Italian Regia Marina (Royal Navy) assigned her to duty with the La Spezia Maritime Command on 10 January 1917 during the Mediterranean U-boat campaign of World War I. She conducted several antisubmarine patrols in the northern Tyrrhenian Sea.

In March 1917, F9 was transferred to the 1st Submarine Squadron at Venice and her sister ship F10 was reassigned to the Brindisi Submarine Squadron, and the two submarines set out on their transfer voyage in company. During their voyage, they were involved in a friendly fire incident on 11 March when the Italian destroyer Euro and torpedo boat Airone mistook them for Central Powers submarines and opened fire on them off Messina, Sicily. The two submarines quickly submerged and avoided damage.

The 1st Submarine Squadron assigned F9 to a base at Porto Corsini, from which she operated in the Adriatic Sea during the Adriatic Campaign. She conducted patrols along the coast of Dalmatia through the end of World War I in November 1918, but without noteworthy results.

After World War I, F9 continued to operate in the Adriatic Sea, participating in maneuvers and conducting training cruises. She was decommissioned and stricken from the navy list on 1 August 1928. She subsequently was scrapped.
