= Italian destroyer Strale (1900) =

Italian Lampo-class destroyer

Strale
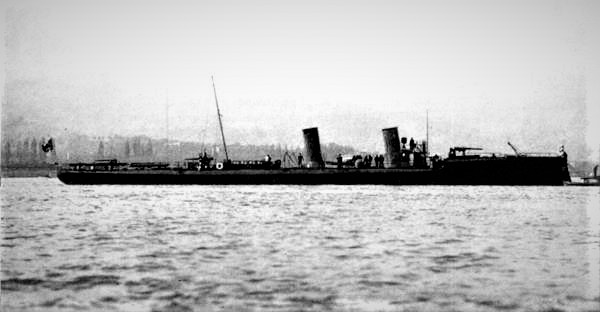

History

Kingdom of Italy
- Name: Strale
- Namesake: Javelin
- Builder: Schichau-Werke, Elbing, Germany
- Laid down: 7 November 1899
- Launched: 19 May 1900
- Completed: 6 July 1901
- Commissioned: July 1901
- Decommissioned: 1924
- Stricken: January 1924
- Fate: Discarded 13 January 1924; Scrapped

General characteristics
- Type: Destroyer
- Displacement: 315 long tons (320 t) normal; 348 long tons (354 t) full load
- Length: 60.00 m (196 ft 10 in) pp; 62.05 m (203 ft 7 in) oa
- Beam: 6.50 m (21 ft 4 in)
- Draught: 2.60 m (8 ft 6 in)
- Propulsion: 2 × vertical triple-expansion steam engines; 4× Thornycroft boilers; 6,000 ihp (4,474 kW)
- Speed: 31 knots (57 km/h; 36 mph)
- Range: 290 nmi (540 km; 330 mi) at 26 knots (48 km/h; 30 mph); 2,000 nmi (3,700 km; 2,300 mi) at 12 knots (22 km/h; 14 mph)
- Complement: 59
- Armament: 6 × 57 mm/43; 2× 356 mm (14 in) torpedo tubes

Strale ("Javelin") was an Italian Lampo-class destroyer. Commissioned into service in the Italian Regia Marina (Royal Navy) in 1901, she served in the Italo-Turkish War and World War I. She was stricken in 1924.

== Construction and commissioning ==
Strale was laid down at the Schichau-Werke in Elbing in the German Empire on 7 November 1899. She was launched on 19 May 1900 and completed on 6 July 1901. She was commissioned in July 1901.

Strale and her five sister ships formed the first class of destroyers built for the Regia Marina, their only predecessor, Fulmine, having been a one-off. Designed by the German Schichau-Werke shipyard, they were seaworthy, robust, fast, and reliable, although they were afflicted by serious problems with seakeeping.

== Service history ==
=== Italo-Turkish War ===
The Italo-Turkish War began on 29 September 1911 with the Kingdom of Italy′s declaration of war on the Ottoman Empire. At the outbreak of war, she was in reserve at Venice. Although she participated in the war, she did not take part in any significant actions during it. The war ended on 18 October 1912 in an Italian victory.

=== World War I ===
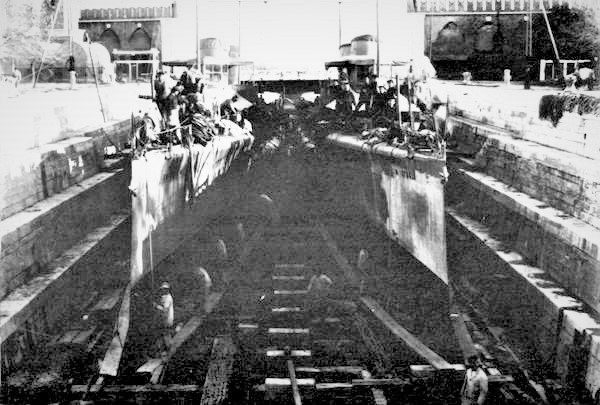
Strale and her sister ship Dardo in drydock.

World War I broke out in 1914, and the Kingdom of Italy entered the war on the side of the Allies with its declaration of war on Austria-Hungary on 23 May 1915. At the time, Strale, under the command of Capitano di corvetta (Corvette Captain) Marsilia, and the destroyers Dardo, Euro, Lampo, and Ostro made up the 4th Destroyer Squadron, under the command of Capitano di fregata (Frigate Captain) F. Gambardella. Strale and her sister ship Euro were based at Tobruk in Italian Cyrenaica. By 1915, the Lampo-class destroyers were of antiquated design and had only limited military usefulness, but during World War I, they were modified, having equipment installed to carry and lay 12 mines, drop depth charges, and tow explosive paravanes, and Strale had her bridge raised. The Lampo-class ships spent the war on escort duty.

On 11 July 1915 Strale, the protected cruisers Marsala and Quarto, the auxiliary cruiser Città di Palermo, the destroyers Animoso, Ardente, Ardito, and Audace, and the torpedo boats Airone, Arpia, Astore, Calliope, Cassiopea, and Clio took part in the occupation of the Palagruža (known to the Italians as the Pelagosa) archipelago in the Adriatic Sea. After Strale and the torpedo boats swept the waters of the Zadlo anchorage for mines, Città di Palermo landed Italian troops on the islands. The operation went smoothly: Two Austro-Hungarian signalmen, who first hid from and then surrendered to the Italians, made up the archipelago's entire garrison.

At 04:00 on 17 July 1915 Strale, Ardito, Airone, Arpia, Astore, Calliope, Clio, the armored cruisers Giuseppe Garibaldi and Vettor Pisani, and the torpedo boats Alcione, Centauro, and Cigno took part in a bombardment of the Ragusa–Cattaro railway. The Italian force broke off the bombardment when Vettor Pisani sighted an Austro-Hungarian submarine at 04:25. The Italians had begun their return voyage to Brindisi when the Austro-Hungarian submarine U-4 attacked the formation at 04:40 and torpedoed Giuseppe Garibaldi, which sank within minutes.

Strale continued her World War I service without taking part in any other significant actions. By late October 1918, Austria-Hungary had effectively disintegrated, and the Armistice of Villa Giusti, signed on 3 November 1918, went into effect on 4 November 1918 and brought hostilities between Austria-Hungary and the Allies to an end. World War I ended a week later with an armistice between the Allies and the German Empire on 11 November 1918.

=== Post-World War I ===
Strale was stricken from the naval register on 13 January 1924. She subsequently was scrapped.
