= Italian destroyer Euro (1900) =

Italian Lampo-class destroyer

Euro
History

Kingdom of Italy
- Name: Euro
- Namesake: Classical name for the sirocco, a Mediterranean wind
- Builder: Schichau-Werke, Elbing, Germany
- Laid down: 9 January 1900
- Launched: 27 August 1900
- Completed: 11 October 1901
- Commissioned: October 1901
- Reclassified: Torpedo boat July 1921
- Renamed: Strale September 1924
- Namesake: Javelin
- Stricken: 13 November 1924
- Fate: Discarded and scrapped

General characteristics
- Type: Destroyer
- Displacement: 315 long tons (320 t) normal; 348 long tons (354 t) full load
- Length: 60.00 m (196 ft 10 in) pp; 62.05 m (203 ft 7 in) oa
- Beam: 6.50 m (21 ft 4 in)
- Draught: 2.60 m (8 ft 6 in)
- Propulsion: 2 × Vertical triple-expansion steam engines; 4× Thornycroft boilers; 6,000 ihp (4,474 kW)
- Speed: 31 knots (57 km/h; 36 mph)
- Range: 290 nmi (540 km; 330 mi) at 26 knots (48 km/h; 30 mph); 2,000 nmi (3,700 km; 2,300 mi) at 12 knots (22 km/h; 14 mph)
- Complement: 59
- Armament: 1 × 76 mm (3 in)/40 gun; 5 × 57 mm/43; 2× 356 mm (14 in) torpedo tubes

Euro (a classical name for the sirocco) was an Italian Lampo-class destroyer. Commissioned into service in the Italian Regia Marina (Royal Navy) in 1901, she served in the Italo-Turkish War and World War I. Reclassified as a torpedo boat in 1921 and then used as a target ship, she was renamed Strale in September 1924 and stricken in November 1924.

== Construction and commissioning ==
Euro was laid down at the Schichau-Werke in Elbing in the German Empire on 9 January 1900. She was launched on 27 August 1900 and completed on 11 October 1901. She was commissioned in October 1901.

== Service history ==
=== Italo-Turkish War ===
The Italo-Turkish War began on 29 September 1911 with the Kingdom of Italy′s declaration of war on the Ottoman Empire. At the outbreak of war, Euro was part of the 2nd Squadron's 1st Division, which also included her sister ships Freccia, Lampo, and Ostro. Euro played an active role in the war. In December 1911, she cooperated with the protected cruiser Liguria, the torpedo cruiser Partenope, and the destroyer Dardo in attacking Ottoman positions at Zuwarah, Misrata, and Argub along the northwestern coast of Ottoman Tripolitania. The war ended on 18 October 1912 in an Italian victory.

=== World War I ===
World War I broke out in 1914, and the Kingdom of Italy entered the war on the side of the Allies with its declaration of war on Austria-Hungary on 23 May 1915. At the time, Euro, Dardo, Lampo, Ostro, and their sister ship Strale made up the 4th Destroyer Squadron, under the command of Capitano di fregata (Frigate Captain) F. Gambardella. Euro and Strale were based at Tobruk in Italian Cyrenaica. By 1915, the Lampo-class destroyers were of antiquated design and had only limited military usefulness, but during World War I, they were modified, having equipment installed to carry and lay 12 mines, drop depth charges, and tow explosive paravanes.

On 9 December 1915 Euro and the destroyer Indomito escorted the auxiliary ship Sterope from Taranto, Italy, to Vlorë (known to the Italians as Valona) in the Principality of Albania.

The presence of Euro and Ostro in the harbor at Durrës (known to the Italians as Durazzo) on the coast of Albania in late December 1916 prompted the Austro-Hungarian Navy to raid the harbor on 29 December 1916 in an attempt to attack them. The two destroyers had left by the time the Austro-Hungarian raid took place and thus escaped damage, although the Austro-Hungarians sank the only ships that were present in the harbor, the Greek steamship Mikael and two sailing ships.

Euro was involved in a friendly fire incident on 11 March 1917 when she and the torpedo boat Airone sighted the Italian submarines F9 and F10 while steaming off Messina, Sicily. Mistaking F9 and F10 for Central Powers submarines, Euro and Airone opened fire on them, forcing them to dive. Both submarines escaped unscathed.

By late October 1918, Austria-Hungary had effectively disintegrated, and the Armistice of Villa Giusti, signed on 3 November 1918, went into effect on 4 November 1918 and brought hostilities between Austria-Hungary and the Allies to an end. World War I ended a week later with an armistice between the Allies and the German Empire on 11 November 1918.

=== Post-World War I ===
In July 1921, Euro was reclassified as a torpedo boat. She was employed as a target ship from 1921 to 1923. Renamed Strale in September 1924, she was stricken from the naval register on 13 November 1924 and subsequently discarded and scrapped.
