= Canon de 274 modèle 1887/1893 =

French naval gun family

- A side view of the French battleship Jauréguiberry showing the single gun turrets amidships.
- Type: Naval gun Coastal artillery Railway artillery
- Place of origin: France

Service history
- In service: 1894-1945
- Used by: France; Nazi Germany
- Wars: World War I World War II

Production history
- Designed: 1887
- Produced: 1894

Specifications
- Mass: 35.4–37.6 t (34.8–37.0 long tons; 39.0–41.4 short tons)
- Barrel length: 12.3 m (40 ft 4 in) L/45
- Shell: Separate loading bagged charge and projectile
- Shell weight: 216–255 kg (476–562 lb)
- Caliber: 274 mm (10.8 in)
- Breech: Interrupted screw
- Elevation: -10° to +25°
- Traverse: -160° to +160°
- Rate of fire: 3 rpm
- Muzzle velocity: 780–815 m/s (2,560–2,670 ft/s)
- Maximum firing range: 24–27 km (15–17 mi) at +25°

The Canon de 274 modèle 1887/1893 were a family of French naval guns developed in the years before World War I that armed a variety of warships of the French Navy. Guns salvaged from scrapped ships found a second life as coastal artillery and railway artillery during World War I and World War II.

== Design ==
The mle 1887/1893 guns were typical built-up guns of the period with several layers of steel reinforcing hoops. The guns used an interrupted screw breech and fired separate loading bagged charges and projectiles. The two designs were similar in construction and performance, the main difference between the two models being their weight 37.6 tonnes for the 1887 and 35.4 tonnes for the 1893. The later Canon de 274 modèle 1893/1896, despite being shorter, used a larger propellant charge which gave them higher muzzle velocity and range.

== Naval use ==
Mle 1887/1893 guns armed pre-dreadnought battleships and ironclads of the French Navy built or refit between 1887 and 1902.

=== Pre-dreadnought battleships ===
- Charles Martel - The secondary armament of this ship consisted of two mle 1887s mounted in single gun turrets on lateral sponsons amidships.
- Carnot - The secondary armament of this ship consisted of two mle 1887s mounted in single gun turrets on lateral sponsons amidships.
- Jauréguiberry - The secondary armament of this ship consisted of two mle 1887s mounted in single gun turrets on lateral sponsons amidships.
- Masséna - The secondary armament of this ship consisted of two mle 1893s mounted in single gun turrets on lateral sponsons amidships.
- Bouvet - The secondary armament of this ship consisted of two mle 1893s mounted in single gun turrets on lateral sponsons amidships.

=== Ironclads ===
- Courbet - This ironclad received three mle 1893s in single mounts during a refit in the 1890s.

== Railway guns ==
A number of mle 1887/1893 naval guns were converted to railway guns under the designation Canon de 274 modèle 87/93 Glissement and saw action during both the First and Second World Wars.

== Ammunition ==
Ammunition was of separate loading type with a bagged charge and projectile. The charge weighed 67.5 kg (149 lb).

The guns were able to fire:

- Armor Piercing Capped - 255 kg (562 lb)
- Common Incendiary - 216 kg (476 lb)
- Semi-Armor Piercing Capped - 255 kg (562 lb)

== Photo gallery ==
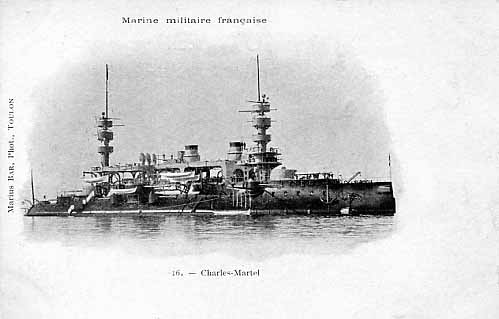
The battleship Charles Martel

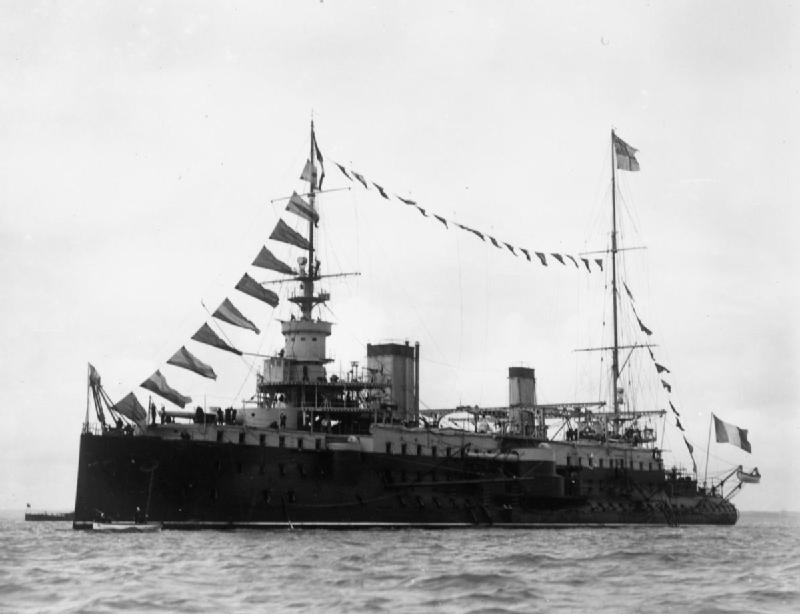
The battleship Carnot

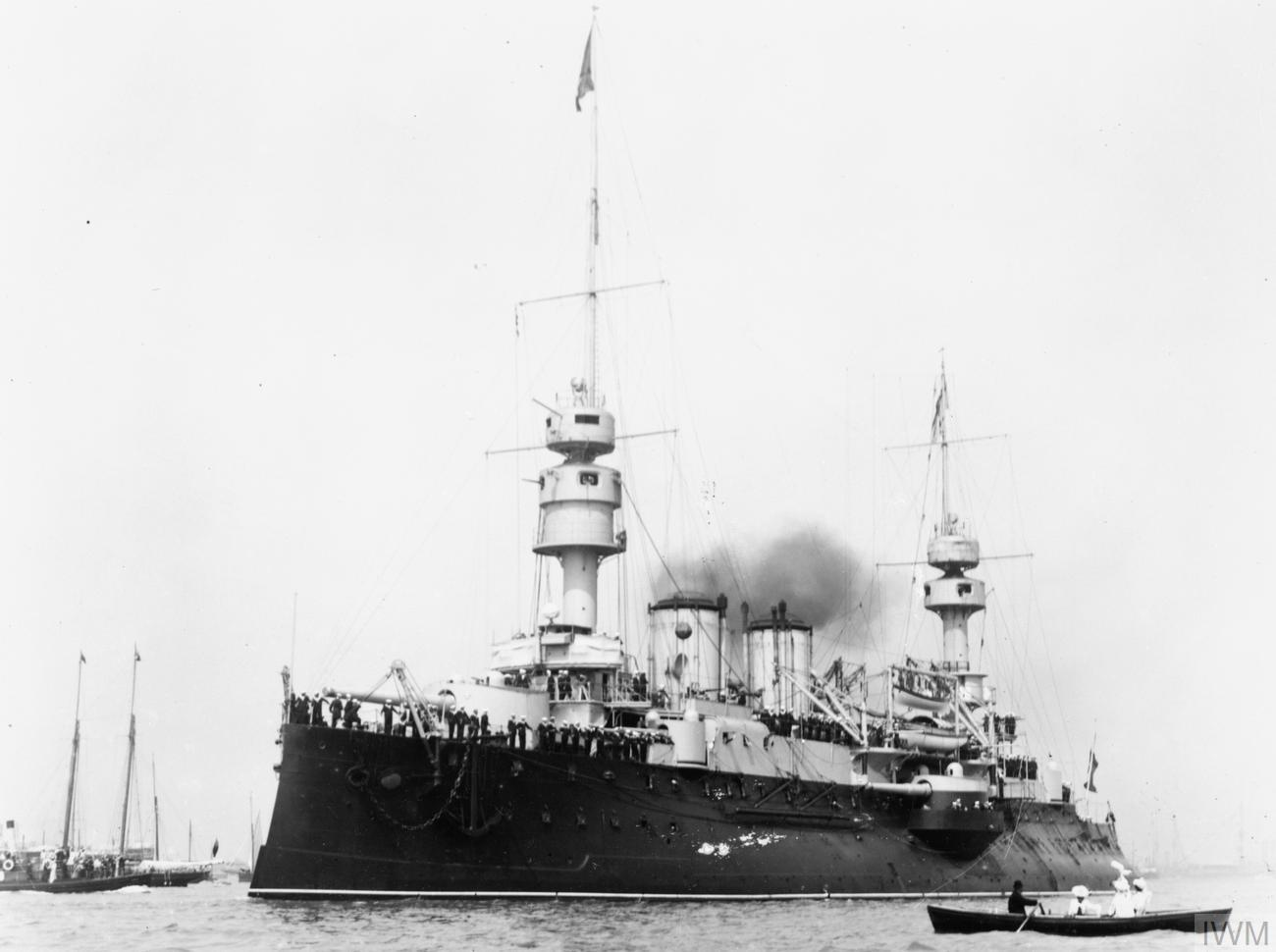
The battleship Jauréguiberry

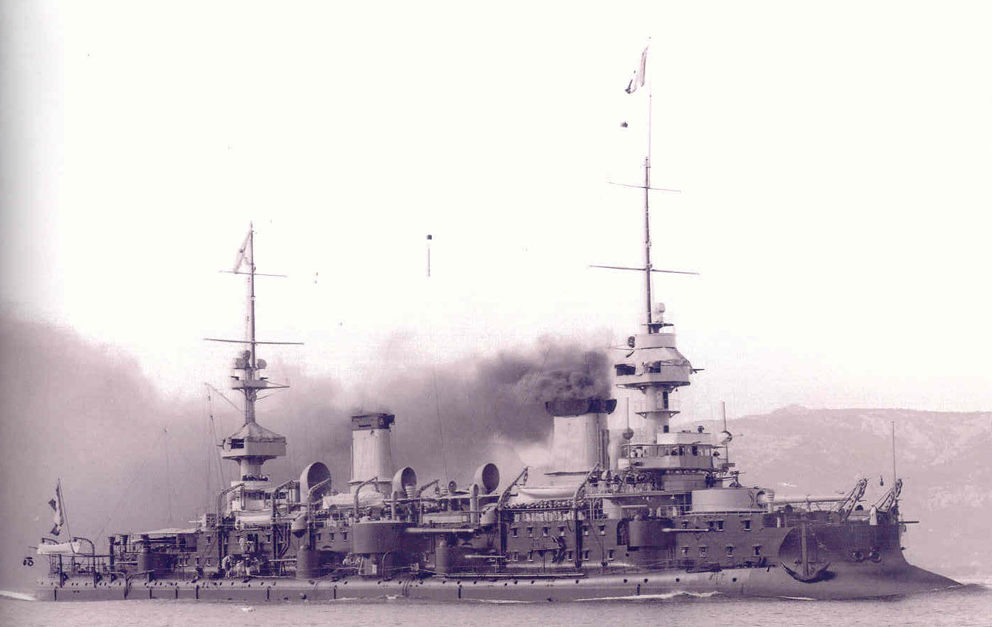
The battleship Masséna

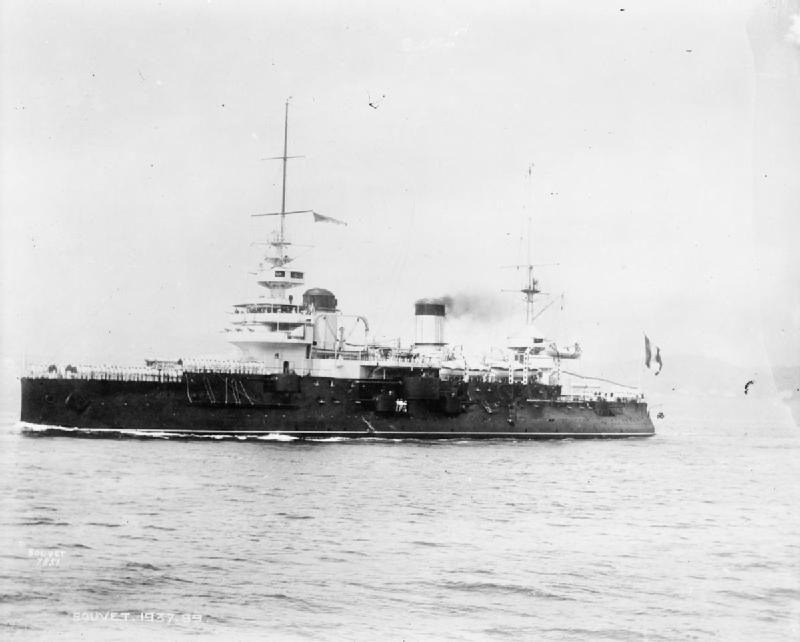
The battleship Bouvet

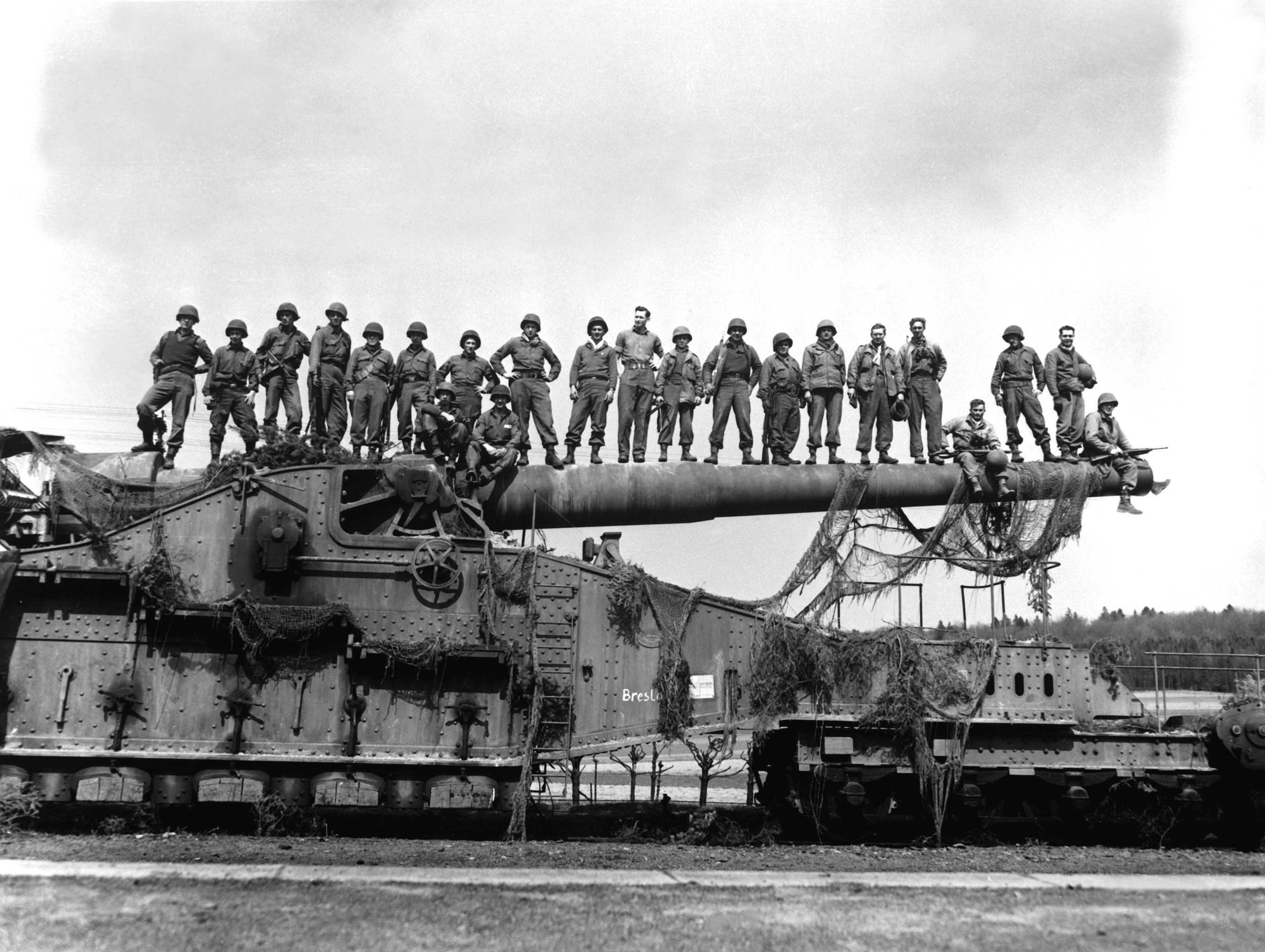
A Canon de 274 modèle 87/93 captured by U.S. troops near Rentwertshausen 10 April 1945

== Bibliography ==
- Friedman, Norman (2011). Naval Weapons of World War One. Barnsley, South Yorkshire, UK: Seaforth. ISBN 978-1-84832-100-7.
