= Lampo-class destroyer =

Italian destroyer class

Lampo class
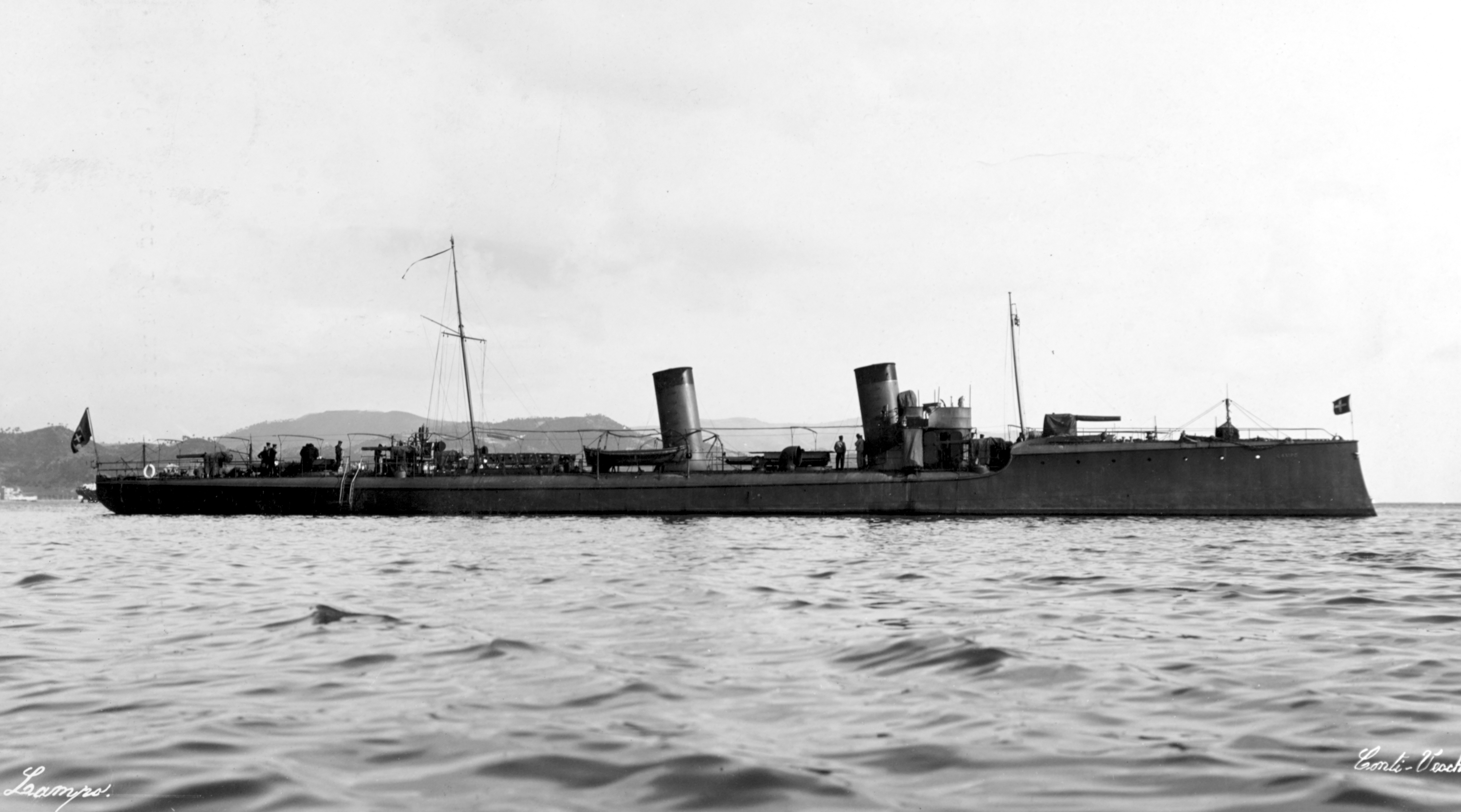
- Lampo circa 1900, just after delivery

Class overview
- Name: Lampo class
- Builders: Schichau-Werke, Elbing
- Operators: Regia Marina
- Preceded by: Fulmine
- Succeeded by: Nembo class
- Built: 1899–1902
- In commission: 1900–1924
- Completed: 6
- Lost: 1
- Scrapped: 5

General characteristics
- Type: Destroyer
- Displacement: 315 long tons (320 t) normal; 348 long tons (354 t) full load
- Length: 60.00 m (196 ft 10 in) pp; 62.05 m (203 ft 7 in) oa
- Beam: 6.50 m (21 ft 4 in)
- Draught: 2.60 m (8 ft 6 in)
- Propulsion: 2 × Vertical triple-expansion steam engines; 4× Thornycroft boilers; 6,000 ihp (4,500 kW)
- Speed: 31 knots (57 km/h; 36 mph)
- Range: 290 nmi (540 km; 330 mi) at 26 knots (48 km/h; 30 mph); 2,000 nmi (3,700 km; 2,300 mi) at 12 knots (22 km/h; 14 mph)
- Complement: 59
- Armament: 1 × 76 mm (3 in)/40 gun; 5 × 57 mm/43; 2 × 356 mm (14 in) torpedo tubes

The Lampo class was a class of six destroyers of the Italian Regia Marina (Royal Navy) built by the German Schichau shipyard from 1899–1901. They served in the Italo-Turkish War (where one was lost) and the surviving ships in the First World War, before being disposed of between 1920 and 1924.

== Design ==
In 1899, the Italian Navy ordered six destroyers from the German shipyard Schichau-Werke of Elbing, Prussia (now Elbląg in Poland). The design was typical for Schichau-designed destroyers of the period, with a raised turtleback (Note: A turtleback is an arched structure over the deck of a ship, normally at the ship's bow.) forecastle, a ram bow and two funnels.

The ships were 60.00 metres (196 ft 10 in) long between perpendiculars and 62.05 metres (203 ft 7 in) overall, with a beam of 6.50 metres (21 ft 4 in) and a draught of 2.60 metres (8 ft 6 in). Displacement was 315 long tons (320 t) normal and 348 long tons (354 t) full load. They were powered by two triple expansion steam engines fed by four Thornycroft water-tube boilers which were rated at 6,000 ihp (4,500 kW) driving two shafts to give a design speed of 30 knots (56 km/h; 35 mph). Sufficient coal was carried to give an endurance of 2,000 nautical miles (3,700 km; 2,300 mi) at 12 knots (22 km/h; 14 mph) or 290 nautical miles (540 km; 330 mi) at 26 knots (48 km/h; 30 mph).

Gun armament varied between ships. Lampo, Freccia, Dardo and Euro carried a single 76 mm (3 in)/40 calibre gun (capable of firing a 5.9 kilograms (13 lb) shell to a range of 9,850 metres (32,320 ft) at a rate of fire of 15 rounds per minute per gun) and five 57 mm/43 guns, while Strale and Ostro carried six 57 mm guns. Torpedo armament consisted of two 356 mm (14 in) torpedo tubes. The ships' crew consisted of 59 officers and men.

The six ships were laid down between 1899 and 1900 and completed between 1900 and 1902. While the ships were fast, reaching speeds of over 31 knots (57 km/h; 36 mph) during sea trials (corresponding to a realistic sea speed of 25 knots (46 km/h; 29 mph)), seaworthiness was poor.

== Service ==
The ships of the class were active during the Italo-Turkish War of 1911–1912. One ship, Freccia ran aground in a storm off Tripoli, Libya, on 12 October 1911, a few days after the city was captured by the Italians. Other ships in the class took part in operations along the coast of Libya, and in the Dodecanese.

In 1914, the remaining ships of the class formed part of the 6th Destroyer Division, based in Libya. During the First World War, the ships of the class were modified for minelaying, being fitted to carry at least 12 mines. The ships were used as escorts in North African waters and in the Tyrrhenian Sea, and as such carried depth charges and anti-submarine sweeps.

The ships of the class were disposed of during the early 1920s, with the last one stricken in November 1924.

== Ships ==
Ship	Laid down	Launched	Completed	Operational History
Lampo	6 May 1899	7 October 1899	23 June 1900	Disposed of 18 March 1920
Freccia	1899	23 November 1899	25 May 1902	Ran aground off Tripoli, 12 October 1911
Dardo	17 August 1899	7 February 1900	16 March 1901	Disposed of 18 March 1920
Strale	7 November 1899	19 May 1900	6 July 1901	Disposed of 13 January 1924
Euro	9 January 1900	27 August 1900	11 October 1901	Reclassified as torpedo-boat 17 January 1921. Used as target ship 1923–24; Renamed Strale 9 September 1924; Disposed of 13 November 1924
Ostro	23 March 1900	9 February 1901	8 December 1901	Disposed of 30 September 1920
