= Italian destroyer Fulmine (1898) =

First Italian destroyer

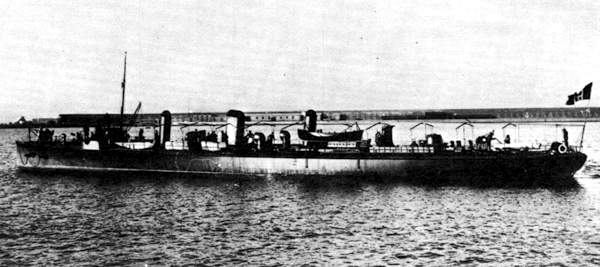
- Fulmine at La Spezia in 1900.

History

Kingdom of Italy
- Name: Fulmine
- Namesake: Lightning
- Builder: Cantieri navali Odero Sestri Ponente, Italy
- Laid down: 14 July 1896
- Launched: 4 December 1898
- Commissioned: 26 October 1900
- Stricken: 15 May 1921
- Fate: Discarded and scrapped

General characteristics
- Type: Destroyer
- Displacement: 298 long tons (303 t) normal; 342 long tons (347 t) full load
- Length: 61.7 m (202 ft 5 in) pp; 62.05 m (203 ft 7 in) oa
- Beam: 6.4 m (21 ft 0 in)
- Draught: 2.1 m (6 ft 11 in)
- Propulsion: 2 × reciprocating steam engines; 4× boilers; 4,675 hp (3,486 kW)
- Speed: 26 knots (48 km/h; 30 mph)
- Range: 1,500 nmi (2,800 km; 1,700 mi) at 8 knots (15 km/h; 9.2 mph)
- Complement: 48
- Armament: As built: 5 × QF 6 pounder Nordenfelt 57 mm/43; 3× 356 mm (14 in) torpedo tubes; Later: 1 × Cannon 76/30 Model 1915; 3 × QF 6 pounder Nordenfelt 57 mm/43; 2 × 356 mm (14 in) torpedo tubes

Fulmine ("Lightning") was the Kingdom of Italy′s first destroyer. Commissioned into service in the Italian Regia Marina (Royal Navy) in 1900, she served in the Italo-Turkish War and World War I. She was stricken in 1921 and scrapped.

== Design, construction, and commissioning ==
Fulmine was laid down at the Cantieri navali Odero (Odero Shipyard) in Sestri Ponente, Italy, on 14 July 1896. She was launched on 4 December 1898 and completed in October 1900. She was commissioned on 26 October 1900.

Designed by the inspector general of the Corps of Naval Engineering (Italian: Corpo del genio della Marina), Ernesto Martinez, Fulmine was inspired by British and German designs of the time. As Italy's first destroyer, Fulmine was an experimental ship with mediocre characteristics; while her armament was quite suitable, her hull had structural problems which prevented her from achieving the maximum speed of 26.5 knots (49.1 km/h; 30.5 mph) envisaged for her. However, designing and building the ship gave both Italian naval architects and the local shipbuilding industry experience in the design and construction of destroyers, a new ship type in the 1890s.

Fulmine quickly was surpassed by subsequent Italian destroyer classes, first the six-ship German-built Lampo class and then the Italian-built six-ship Nembo and 11-ship Soldato classes. During her service, however, her armament — originally five 57 mm/43-caliber guns and three 356 mm (14 in) torpedo tubes — was partially modernized, ultimately becoming one Cannon 76/30 Model 1915 gun, three 57 mm/43 guns, and two 356 mm (14 in) torpedo tubes.

== Service history ==
=== 1900–1910 ===
Before 1910, the Italian physicist Domenico Pacini used Fulmine for a series of experiments to study the ionization of air.

=== Italo-Turkish War ===
Fulmine′s first opportunity to participate in combat operations came in the Italo-Turkish War, which began on 29 September 1911 with the Kingdom of Italy′s declaration of war on the Ottoman Empire while Fulmine was serving as a training ship at Leghorn (Livorno). In December 1911, she joined the battleships Re Umberto and Sicilia, the torpedo cruiser Partenope, and the torpedo boat Cassiopea in bombarding the oasis on the east side of Tripoli in Ottoman Tripolitania. On 25 January 1912 she seized the French mail steamer Favignano in the waters of French Tunisia and thoroughly searched her for contraband. She found none, but her action created such animosity against Italians among Tunisians that many Italian residents of Tunisia left the country. The incident also prompted the French Navy to send a force consisting of the battleship Henri IV and four torpedo boats from Bizerte to the southeastern border of Tunisia to stop contraband traffic between Tunisia and the Ottoman Empire and enforce France's obligations as a neutral country.

On 10 April 1912 Fulmine, the armored cruisers Carlo Alberto and Marco Polo, the auxiliary cruisers Città di Catania and Città di Siracusa, and the torpedo boat Alcione bombarded Zuwarah, a smuggling center for war materials for Ottoman troops on the coast of Ottoman Tripolitania, which was followed by a fake amphibious landing simulated by the steamers Hercules, Sannio, and Toscana. The war ended on 18 October 1912 in an Italian victory.

=== World War I ===
World War I broke out in 1914, and the Kingdom of Italy entered the war on the side of the Allies with its declaration of war on Austria-Hungary on 23 May 1915. At the time, Fulmine was not operational and was temporarily assigned to the 5th Destroyer Squadron, which also included the destroyers Aquilone, Borea, Espero, Nembo, and Turbine. By 1915, she was of antiquated design and limited military value, and she spent the war engaged primarily in escort duties and antisubmarine warfare.

During one escort operation Fulmine was involved in an incident that demonstrated problems that existed in the system the Allies had adopted for escorts in the Mediterranean Sea. The agreement between the Regia Marina, French Navy, and British Royal Navy divided the Mediterranean into areas of responsibility for each of the navies, within each of which the escort of ships in transit was the responsibility of the navy that had jurisdiction over that area. While escorting the steamer Minas, loaded with troops and bound from Naples, Italy, to Thessaloniki, Greece, Fulmine reached the limit of Italy's escort zone about 200 nautical miles (370 km; 230 mi) east of Malta, where a British warship should have taken over the escort. Due to a mix-up, however, no British ship met Minas. Continuing her voyage unescorted, Minas was torpedoed by the Imperial German Navy submarine U-39 and sank at 36°25′N 018°24′E with the loss of 870 men on 15 February 1917.

By late October 1918, Austria-Hungary had effectively disintegrated, and the Armistice of Villa Giusti, signed on 3 November 1918, went into effect on 4 November 1918 and brought hostilities between Austria-Hungary and the Allies to an end. World War I ended a week later with an armistice between the Allies and the German Empire on 11 November 1918.

=== Post-World War I ===
Fulmine was stricken on 15 May 1921. She subsequently was scrapped.
