= Corbet (surname) =

Corbet is a surname.

== Origins ==
The surname's linguistic origins can usually be traced back to the Latin word for crows and ravens, corvus.

=== France ===
Corbet is a surname originally of French origins. In Old French, corbet meant raven or crow, and may have been a nickname based on a person's features or characteristics, such as dark hair. The Old French word corbet is a diminutive of corb, which is also a surname from a nickname with the same meaning. It may also be a variant of Corbin.

=== England ===
In England, Corbet emerged as a surname from the name of a Norman noble who came to England with the Norman Conquest, and passed his name to his offspring. Sharing from its original French origins, Corbet was a medieval nickname from Anglo-Norman which could be translated literally as "little crow". This nickname may have referred to someone with dark hair, like a raven's feathers.

=== Scotland ===
The surname is amongst the oldest surnames in Scotland, dating back to at least the 12th century, with Walter Corbet being a knight at the time, whose descendants become major Scottish landowners. In some cases, Corbet may be considered a Scottish variant of Corbett. In either case, it is a diminutive of the French word corbeau, meaning a crow or raven.

=== Belgium ===
In the regions of Belgium that historically speak a Romance language, the surname Corbet comes from an ancient personal name derived from the root "Corbeau", or as a variant of Courbet.

== People ==
Notable people with the surname include:

=== Academics ===
- Alexander Steven Corbet (1896–1948), British chemist and naturalist
- August Corbet (1907–1964), Belgian musicologist
- David Eryl Corbet Yale (1928–2021), British historian
- Gordon Barclay Corbet (born 1933), Scottish mammalogist
- Philip Steven Corbet (1929–2008), British entomologist
- Robert Corbet Singleton (1810–1881), Irish college warden

=== Arts ===
- Barry Corbet (1936–2004), Canadian-American mountaineer, film-maker, and author
- Brady Corbet (born 1988), American actor and filmmaker
- Charles-Louis Corbet (1758–1808), French sculptor
- Christian Cardell Corbet (born 1966), Canadian sculptor
- Denys Corbet (1826–1909), Guernsey poet
- Edith Corbet (1846–1920), British landscape painter
- Jeanine Corbet, American filmmaker
- Mary Corbet, English stage actress
- Matthew Ridley Corbet (1850–1902), British neoclassical painter
- Philip Corbet (c. 1802–1877), English painter

=== Business ===
- Denise L'Estrange-Corbet, New Zealand fashion designer and businesswoman
- Jean-Charles Corbet, French aviation executive
- Kathleen Corbet (born 1960), American businesswoman

=== Military ===
- John Corbet (surgeon), American military surgeon for Argentina
- Moses Corbet (1728–1814), British Army officer and lieutenant governor of Jersey
- Peter Corbet, 2nd Baron Corbet (died 1322), English noble
- Richard Corbet (knight) (died 1493), English knight
- Robert Corbet (died 1810), British naval officer
- William Corbet (1779–1842), Anglo-Irish soldier in the service of France

=== Politics ===
- Andrew Corbet (1522–1578), English politician
- Andrew Corbet (1580–1637), English politician
- Clement Corbet (c. 1576–1652), English jurist
- Francis Corbet Singleton (1812–1887), Irish-Australian politician and public servant
- Freda Corbet (1900–1993), British politician
- Jerome Corbet (died 1598), English politician and lawyer
- John Corbet (1500–?), English politician
- John Corbet (died 1559), English politician
- Sir John Corbet, 1st Baronet, of Sprowston (c. 1589–1628), English politician
- Sir John Corbet, 1st Baronet, of Stoke upon Tern (1594–1662), English politician
- John Corbet of Sundorne (1751–1817), English politician
- Ken Corbet (born 1948), American politician
- Leo Corbet (1936–2019), American lawyer and politician
- Miles Corbet (c. 1594–1662), English politician and regicide
- Reginald Corbet (died 1566), English lawyer
- Richard Corbet (died 1566), English politician
- Richard Corbet (c. 1545–1606), English politician
- Sir Richard Corbet, 2nd Baronet (1640–1683), English politician
- Sir Richard Corbet, 4th Baronet (1696–1774), British politician
- Robert Corbet (c. 1354–1417), English politician
- Robert Corbet (1383–1420), English politician and soldier
- Robert Corbet (1542–1583), English diplomat and politician
- Robert Corbet (died 1676), English politician
- Sir Robert Corbet, 4th Baronet (c. 1670–1740), English politician
- Roger Corbet (died 1395), English politician
- Roger Corbet (died 1430), English politician and soldier
- Roger Corbet (c. 1501–1538), English politician
- Sir Vincent Corbet, 1st Baronet (1617–1656), English lawyer and politician
- William Joseph Corbet (1824–1909), Irish politician
- Sir William Corbet, 5th Baronet (1702–1748), British merchant and politician

=== Religion ===
- Edward Corbet (c. 1603–1658), English clergyman
- Francis Corbet, Irish Anglican dean
- John Corbet (1603–1641), Scottish minister
- Richard Corbet (1582–1635), English clergyman

=== Sports ===
- Andrew Corbett (born 1982), English soccer player
- Jennifer Corbet (born 1965), American rower and magazine publisher
- René Corbet (born 1973), Canadian ice hockey player

=== Other ===
- Henry Corbet (1820–1878), English agricultural writer and editor
- Hugo Corbet de Caux (c. 1030–1081), Norman noble, progenitor of the Corbet family in Britain
- Jonathan Corbet, co-founder of LWN.net
- Roger Fitz-Corbet (c. 1050–1121), Norman Baron
- Sybilla Corbet of Alcester (c. 1077–1157), English noblewoman and mistress

== See also ==
- Corbett (surname) an alternate spelling for "Corbet" from the Norman name "Corbé", migrating from Normandy, France to England and Scotland, where it is occasionally spelled Corbet or Corbett.
- Courbet (disambiguation)
- Corbet Family
- Corbet Baronets
- Barony of Caus
- Corbet, Northern Ireland
