= Courbet (disambiguation) =

Gustave Courbet (January 10, 1819–December 31, 1877) was a French painter and sculptor.

Courbet may also refer to:

- Courbet (surname), including a list of people with the name
- French ship Courbet
  - French ironclad Courbet
  - French battleship Courbet (1911)
  - French frigate Courbet, a French frigate
- Courbet Peninsula, a peninsula in the northeastern portion of the island of Kerguelen
- 8238 Courbet, a main-belt asteroid
- Courbet (company), a French jewelry maison
- Musée Courbet museum dedicated to the French painter Gustave Courbet
- Zemmouri, a town in Algeria formerly named Courbet between 1886 and 1962
