= Edward Burton (theologian) =

English theologian

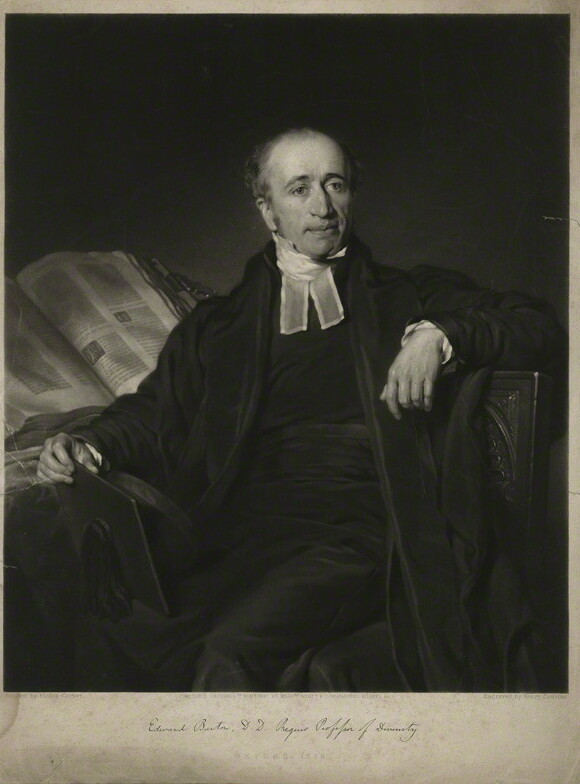
Portrait of Edward Burton by Henry Cousins, after Philip Corbet (1837)

Edward Burton (13 February 1794 – 19 January 1836) was an English theologian, Regius Professor of Divinity at Oxford.

== Life ==
The son of Major Edward Burton, he was born at Shrewsbury on 13 February 1794. He was educated at Westminster School, and matriculated as a commoner of Christ Church, Oxford, on 15 May 1812, gaining a studentship the next year, and in 1815, obtained a first class both in classics and mathematics. Having taken his B.A. degree on 29 October 1815, he was ordained to the curacy of Pettenhall, Staffordshire. On 28 May 1818, he proceeded M.A.

He paid a long visit to the continent of Europe, chiefly occupying himself in work at the public libraries of France and Italy. In 1824, he was select preacher. On 12 May 1825, he married Helen, daughter of Archdeacon Joseph Corbett, of Longnor Hall, Shropshire. After his marriage, he resided at Oxford. In 1827, he was made examining chaplain to the bishop, and in 1828, preached the Bampton lectures. On the death of Charles Lloyd, Bishop of Oxford and Regius Professor of Divinity, Burton was appointed to succeed him in the professorship in 1829, and took the degree of D.D. the same year. As professor, he was also canon of Christ Church and rector of Ewelme, where, uncommonly for the time, he introduced open seats into the church in the place of pews. He died in Ewelme on 19 January 1836, in his forty-second year.

== Works ==
Among his works are:

- An Introduction to the Metre of the Greek Tragedians, 1814.
- A Description of the Antiquities … of Rome, 1821, 1828.
- The Power of the Keys, 1823.
- Testimonies of the Ante-Nicene Fathers to the Divinity of Christ, 1826, 1829.
- An edition of the Works of Bishop Bull, 1827.
- An Inquiry into the Heresies of the Apostolic Age Bampton Lectures 1829.
- The Greek Testament, with English notes, 1830, 1835.
- Testimonies of the Ante-Nicene Fathers to the Doctrine of the Trinity, 1831.
- Advice for the Proper Observance of the Sunday, 1831, 1852.
- The Three Primers … of Henry VIII, 1834.
- Lectures on Ecclesiastical History, 1831, 1833.
- An edition of Pearson on the Creed, 1833.
- Thoughts on the Separation of Church and State, 1834, 1868.

He also superintended the publication of Peter Elmsley's edition of the Medea and‘Heraclidæ, 1828, and of some posthumous works of Bishop Lloyd.

Among the works on which he was engaged at the time of his death was an edition of Eusebius, published 1838, 1856; the notes of this volume were separately edited by Friedrich Adolf Heinichen, 1840; the text was used in the edition of Eusebius of 1872. Burton was also the author of other smaller works.
