= Wallonia (disambiguation) =

Wallonia is the predominantly French-speaking southern region of Belgium.

Wallonia may also refer to:

- Wallonia, Kentucky
- An administrative region created under Flamenpolitik in 1917 by the occupying German forces
- Romance Belgium, a subdivision of Belgium in dialectology
