= French ship Courbet =

Three ships of the French Navy have been named Courbet in honour of Amédée Courbet:

- Courbet (1882–1909), an ironclad battleship
- Courbet (1913–1944), lead dreadnought battleship of the Courbet class
- Courbet, in active service, a La Fayette-class multi-mission frigate
