= Dévastation-class ironclad =

Class of ironclad battleships

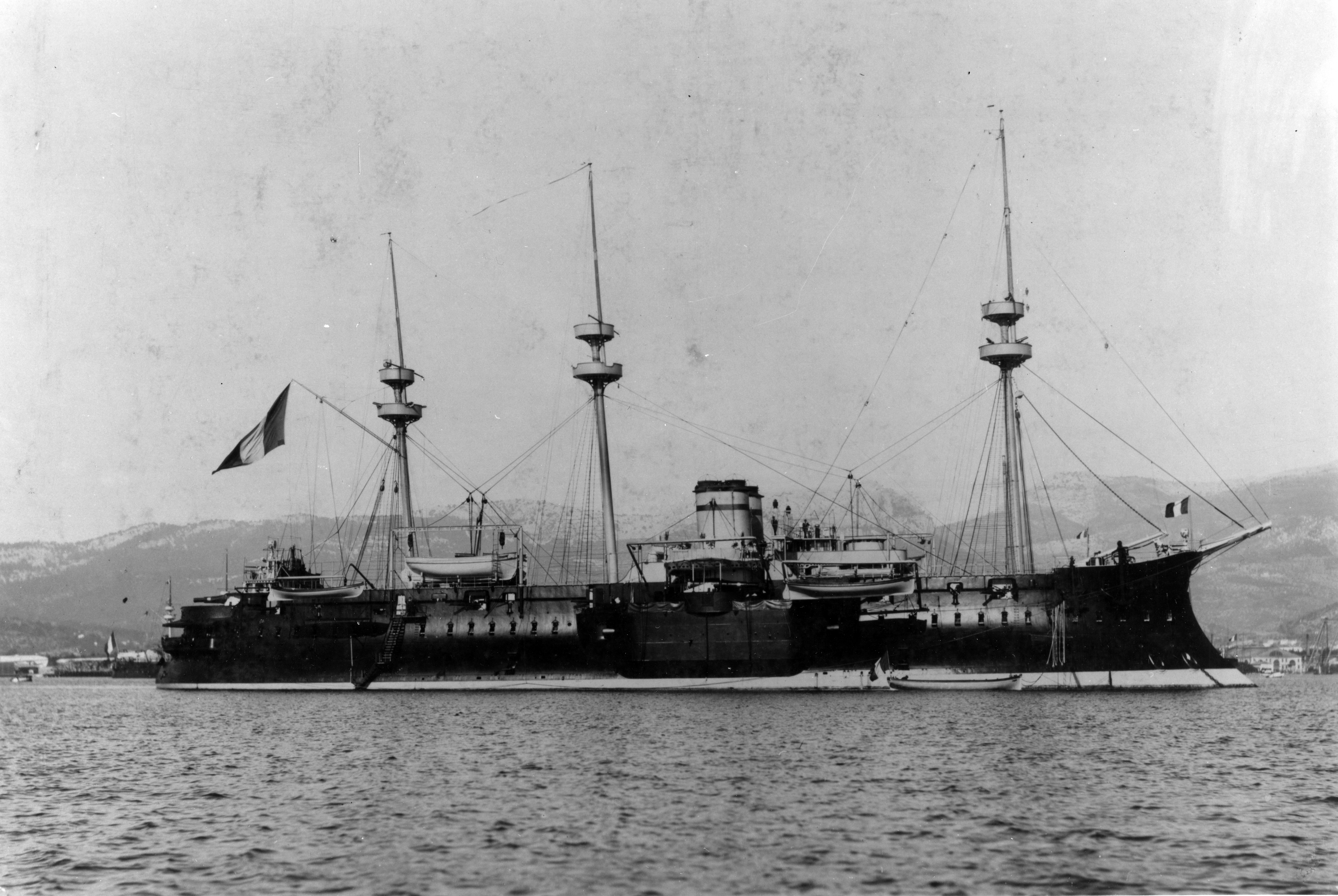
- Courbet in Toulon, probably in the early 1890s

Class overview
- Name: Dévastation class
- Operators: French Navy
- Preceded by: Redoutable
- Succeeded by: Amiral Duperré
- Built: 1875-1886
- In commission: 1882-1922
- Completed: 2
- Scrapped: 2

General characteristics (Note: Figures are for Dévastation; Courbet differed in several respects)
- Class & type: Central battery ship
- Displacement: 10,450 long tons (10,620 t)
- Length: 100.52 m (329 ft 9 in) (loa)
- Beam: 21.26 m (69 ft 9 in)
- Draft: 8.08–8.23 m (26 ft 6 in – 27 ft 0 in)
- Installed power: 12 × fire-tube boilers; 8,300 indicated horsepower (6,200 kW)
- Propulsion: 2 × compound steam engines; 2 × screw propellers
- Speed: 15 to 15.5 kn (27.8 to 28.7 km/h; 17.3 to 17.8 mph)
- Range: 3,100 nmi (5,700 km; 3,600 mi) at 10 kn (19 km/h; 12 mph)
- Complement: 689 men
- Armament: 4 × 340 mm (13.4 in) guns; 4 × 274 mm (10.8 in) guns; 6 × 5.4 in (138 mm) guns; 8 × 37 mm (1.5 in) Hotchkiss revolver cannon; 5 × 356 mm (14 in) torpedo tubes
- Armor: Belt: 178 to 381 mm (7 to 15 in); Casemate: 241 mm (9.5 in); Deck: 61 mm (2.4 in)

The Dévastation class, sometimes called the Courbet class, were a class of two ironclad warships built for the French Navy in the 1870s and early 1880s. The two ships, Dévastation and Courbet, where based on the preceding ironclad Redoutable, but enlarged to carry a more powerful armament. They were hybrid central battery and barbette ships, carrying their main battery of four 340 mm (13.4 in) guns in the central battery and three of their four 274 mm (10.8 in) guns in open barbette mounts on the upper deck. They were the largest central-battery ships ever built by any navy.

The two ships spent the 1880s and early 1890s in the Mediterranean Fleet, where they participated in routine training exercises. Courbet was involved in a series of accidents during this period, including a collision with a cruiser and a minor grounding. Dévastation and Courbet were modernized in the late 1890s and early 1900s. The former never returned to active service, but Courbet served in the Northern Squadron until 1904, when she was placed in reserve before being sold for scrap in 1910. Dévastation lingered on in the French Navy's inventory for several years, serving first as a training ship and then as a floating prison during World War I. She was eventually sold to ship breakers in 1921, but ran aground while under tow. The wreck was refloated in 1927 and scrapped.

== Design ==
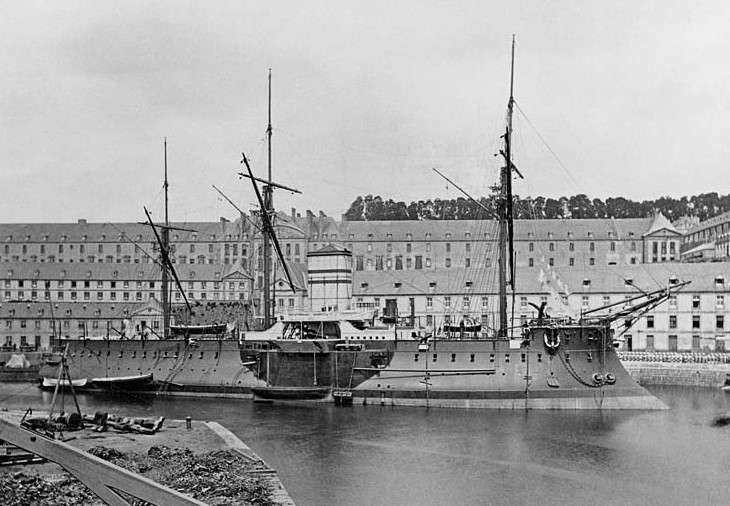
Redoutable, which provided the basis of the Dévastation class

In the aftermath of the Franco-Prussian War of 1870–1871, the French government passed a new construction program to begin in 1872, which called for several new ironclad warships. Two first-class ironclads were projected for the 1872 budget, but only one—Redoutable—was actually begun. Before work on that ship started, the Conseil des travaux (Board of Construction) proposed a radical departure for the next ship to be built, abandoning heavy armor for the main battery armament and instead relying on extensive internal subdivision to protect the ship from flooding, as had been suggested by Louis-Émile Bertin. The new ship would otherwise be laid out similarly to Redoutable.

In 1873, Vice Admiral Charles de Dompierre d'Hornoy became the naval minister, and he favored heavy armor protection over Bertin's concept. Instead, he requested a pair of designs, one modeled on Redoutable that included a hybrid central battery and barbette mounts for its armament, and the other with only the barbette arrangement for its main battery. Both variants adopted the 320 mm (12.6 in) gun, an increase over the 274 mm (10.8 in) gun used aboard Redoutable, though the central battery variant also carried four of the smaller guns in the barbettes.

At the same time the French were considering these new designs, Italy began work on the very large Duilio-class ironclads in the early 1870s. The French initially ignored the development and instead chose the design based on Redoutable. The design specifications were sent to the naval engineer Louis de Bussy, who had also designed Redoutable; he prepared a more detailed design. While he worked, the navy attempted to secure funding for the ironclads that had been authorized under the 1872 construction program, but no money was allocated until the 1875 budget for the first ship, to have been named Foudroyant.

De Bussy originally intended to arm the new ship with four 320 mm guns and two 274 mm guns, the former in a central casemate and the latter in open barbettes above the casemate. The Conseil des travaux (Board of Construction) examined his initial proposal on 16 March 1875, and made several requests for changes. These included changes to the arrangement of some of the guns, an extension of the armor deck for the entire length of the ship, and the addition of a second propeller. De Bussy submitted his revised design on 4 January 1876; he had been forced to reduce the thickness of the belt armor from 400 mm (15.7 in) to 380 mm (15 in) to offset the weight of the longer armor deck.

The naval minister, Léon Martin Fourichon, approved the design on 11 May, and authorized the construction of two ships, Dévastation and Foudroyant, which was subsequently renamed Courbet in 1885, which were the largest central battery ships ever built by any navy. The navy continued to make changes to the design; the 320 mm guns were replaced with 340 mm (13.4 in) weapons, and two more 274 mm guns were added as chase weapons. They are sometimes called the Courbet class, as she had begun construction first, though Dévastation was launched and completed earlier.

=== Characteristics and machinery ===
Plan and profile drawing of the Dévastation class and the similar Redoutable

The ships of the Dévastation class were 94.44 m (309 ft 10 in) long between perpendiculars, 96.39 m (316 ft 3 in) long at the waterline, and 100.52 m (329 ft 9 in) long overall. They had a beam of 21.26 m (69 ft 9 in) and a draft of 7.8 to 8.23 m (25 ft 7 in to 27 ft 0 in). They displaced 10,450 long tons (10,620 t). As was standard for French capital ships of the period, they had a pronounced ram bow and tumblehome sides. Their hulls were of mixed iron and steel construction. They were fitted with three pole masts equipped with spotting tops for their main battery guns. Steering was controlled with a single rudder, though the ships proved to be difficult to maneuver. The crew varied between 689 and 721 officers and enlisted men.

Their propulsion machinery consisted of two compound steam engines of the Woolf pattern, with steam provided by twelve coal-burning fire-tube boilers, which were ducted into a pair of funnels placed side-by-side amidships. Their engines were rated to produce 6,000 indicated horsepower (4,500 kW) for a top speed of 15 to 15.5 kn (27.8 to 28.7 km/h; 17.3 to 17.8 mph). On her initial trials in 1882, Dévastation reached 8,350 ihp (6,230 kW) for 15.17 knots (28.09 km/h; 17.46 mph). The ships carried 565 long tons (574 t) of coal, which provided a cruising radius of 3,100 nautical miles (5,700 km; 3,600 mi) at an economical speed of 10 knots (19 km/h; 12 mph). To supplement the steam engines, Dévastation was equipped with a three-masted full-ship rig, though this was quickly reduced to a barque rig. Courbet, meanwhile, received a three-masted schooner rig.

=== Armament and armor ===
The ships' main battery consisted of four 340 mm guns mounted in a central, armored casemate. Two guns could fire ahead on a limited arc and two could fire astern. The guns carried aboard Dévastation were 18-caliber M1875 models, while Courbet received longer 21-caliber M1881 variants. These were supported by a secondary battery four 274 mm guns; Dévastation's were 18-caliber M1870 weapons and Courbet's were slightly longer 19.75-caliber M1875 pieces. One was in the bow under the forecastle, two were in open barbette mounts on the upper deck amidships, and the fourth was on the upper deck at the stern.

They were also armed with a tertiary battery of six 138 mm (5.4 in) guns, 21-caliber M1870M type aboard Dévastation and 30-caliber M1881 breech-loading guns aboard Courbet. A pair was carried forward of the main battery, one gun per broadside, and the remaining four were astern, two per broadside. For defense against torpedo boats, Dévastation carried eight 37 mm (1.5 in) 1-pounder Hotchkiss revolver cannon, all in individual mounts, while Courbet was completed with eighteen of the guns. Courbet also carried a pair of 65 mm (2.6 in) landing guns for use ashore, and a 47 mm (1.9 in) revolver cannon for one of her steam pinnaces. Their armament was rounded out with four 356 mm (14 in) torpedo tubes in above-water launchers for Dévastation and five of the tubes for Courbet. The former's tubes were above water, two per broadside, while Courbet carried two of hers in the bow, one on each broadside, and the fifth in the stern, all above water.

The ships were protected with wrought iron armor; their belt extended for the entire length of the hull, and from 1.95 m (6 ft 5 in) below the waterline to 0.85 m (2 ft 9 in) above. Amidships, it was 380 mm (15 in) thick, where it protected the ship's ammunition magazines and propulsion machinery spaces, Forward, it was reduced to 220 mm (8.7 in), and aft, it was reduced to 300 mm (11.8 in). The armored casemate for the main battery were 241 mm (9.5 in) thick. On either end of the battery, an armor deck protected the ship's internal spaces; it was 60 mm (2.4 in) thick layered on 20 mm (0.79 in) deck plating. It was connected to the upper edge of the armor belt.

=== Modifications ===
Plan and profile drawing of the Dévastation as modernized

Both ships were modernized several times throughout their careers. Dévastation had her main battery guns replaced with four 320 mm (12.6 in) 20-caliber M1875–81 guns, and an additional four 47 mm revolver cannon and two 37 mm revolvers were added. Her armament was altered again in 1896, a pair of 65 mm (2.6 in) quick-firing guns were added, the 47 mm revolvers were replaced with six single-barrel 47 mm quick-firing guns, and the number of 37 mm revolver cannon was increased to twenty. In 1901, Dévastation had a new, armored conning tower installed in place of the original light structure. The new tower had 80 mm (3.1 in) of armor plate on the sides. At the same time, her propulsion system was replaced with new vertical triple-expansion steam engines and twelve Belleville boilers of the water-tube type. Work on the ship was finished in 1902.

In 1894, Courbet's light armament was revised to include eighteen 65 mm (2.6 in) guns and seven 37 mm revolver cannon. More extensive work was carried out in 1897, when the ship received a new, larger conning tower with 80 mm of armor plate. The light guns that had been present in her upper fighting tops were removed, as were the two forward torpedo tubes. In addition, the gun shields fitted to the barbette guns were replaced with vertical armor plates on the front. The ship also received new fire-tube boilers to replace the worn-out boilers. The Navy had intended to completely rearm the ship, but a change in naval ministers led to a shift in priorities, so the alterations to the main and secondary batteries were deferred. Additional work was carried out between September 1899 and December 1900. Her existing masts and bowsprit were removed, and two larger military masts with two fighting tops apiece were installed in their place. Her 270 mm guns were removed; the bow position received a 138.6 mm 30-caliber M1881/84 gun, while the three barbette positions had 240 mm 40-caliber M1893 guns. Her light battery was revised again slightly, to sixteen of the 47 mm guns, eight 37 mm revolvers, and two 37 mm guns.

== Ships ==
Courbet was originally named Foudroyant ("Lightning"), but on 25 June 1885, she was renamed to honor Admiral Amédée Courbet, who had died of cholera after leading French naval forces through much of the Sino-French War.

Name	Builder	Authorized	Laid down	Launched	Completed
Dévastation	Arsenal de Lorient	1876	20 December 1875	19 August 1879	15 July 1882
Courbet	Arsenal de Toulon	1875	19 July 1875	27 April 1882	20 October 1886
N	None	1876	Re-ordered as Amiral Duperré		

== Service history ==
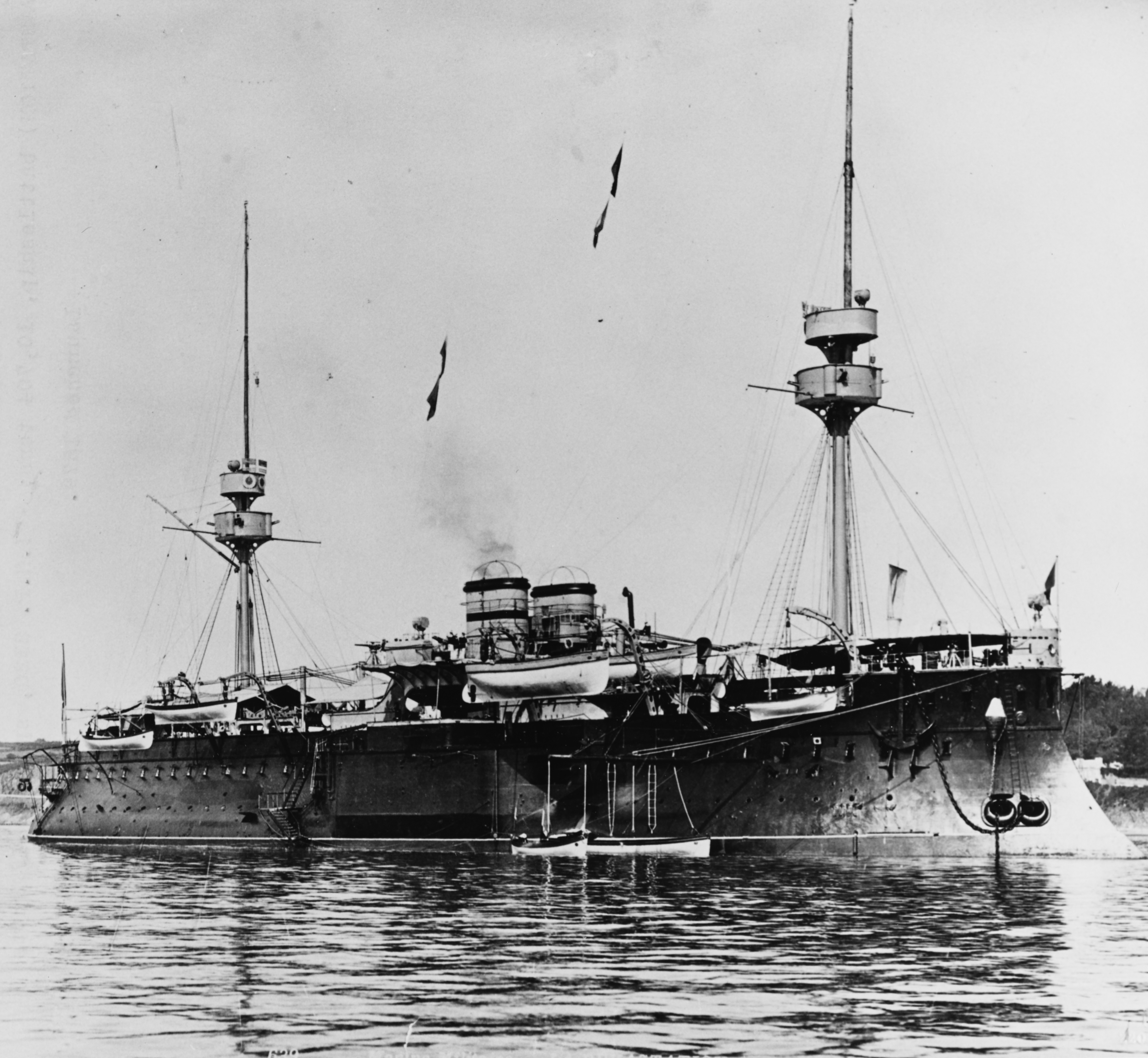
Dévastation later in her career

After entering service in 1882, Dévastation completed sea trials but almost immediately returned to the shipyard for modifications to her guns, which were completed in 1885. She then served in the Mediterranean Fleet. Courbet's initial service consisted of lengthy sea trials that were not completed until 1887. She joined her sister in the Mediterranean Fleet, and the two ironclads took part in routine training exercises and experiments in the Mediterranean Sea through the end of the 1880s. These exercises gamed conflicts in the western Mediterranean, and frequently tested defenses of French ports. During one such set of maneuvers in 1889, Courbet accidentally collided with the cruiser D'Estrées, inflicting serious damage on the latter vessel. Another mishap occurred during the 1890 maneuvers when Courbet's rudder broke off. A major accident involving one of the 340 mm guns aboard another ship in 1890 led to both Dévastation-class ironclads having those weapons replaced by 320 mm (13 in) guns. They thereafter returned to routine training exercises through the mid-1890s.

During fleet exercises in 1895, Courbet ran aground, but she was not seriously damaged in the accident. By the mid-1890s, new pre-dreadnought battleships had begun to enter service, beginning with the battleship Brennus in 1896. Dévastation was reduced to reserve status in 1897, being reactivated only for major training exercises. Courbet, meanwhile, remained in service with the fleet through 1897. Courbet had new water-tube boilers installed in 1898, and she was thereafter moved to the Northern Squadron. The ship took part in training maneuvers for the next several years, including a cruise to visit Spain and Portugal in 1899 and large-scale exercises combined with the Mediterranean Fleet in 1901 and 1902.

Dévastation was heavily reconstructed between 1899 and 1902, which included an entirely new armament and propulsion system. She was transferred to the Northern Squadron, but despite the modernization, she never returned to active service. Courbet was placed in reserve in 1904, subsequently being sold to ship breakers in 1910. Stricken from the naval register in 1909, Dévastation was used in subsidiary roles, initially as a training ship. During World War I, she was converted into a prison ship. She was eventually sold to ship breakers in 1921, but ran aground while under tow in 1922. Dévastation was refloated in 1927 and scrapped.
