= French ironclad Dévastation =

1879 French Navy ironclad battleship

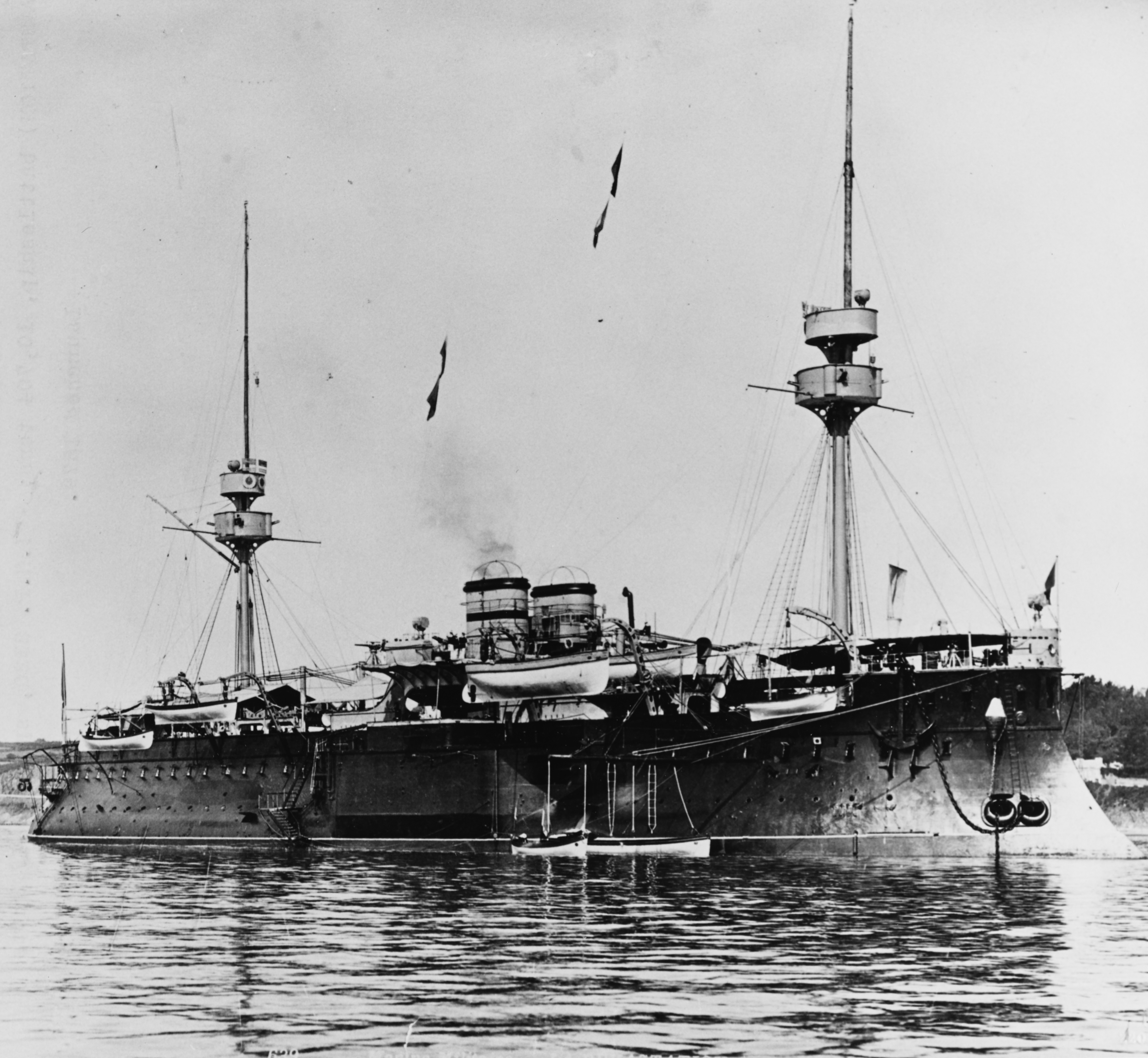
- Dévastation later in her career

History

France
- Name: Dévastation
- Builder: Lorient
- Laid down: 20 December 1875
- Launched: 19 August 1879
- Commissioned: 15 July 1882
- Out of service: April 1913
- Stricken: 5 February 1909
- Fate: Broken up, 1927

General characteristics
- Class & type: Dévastation-class ironclad
- Type: Central battery ship
- Displacement: 10,450 long tons (10,620 t)
- Length: 100.52 m (329 ft 9 in) (loa)
- Beam: 21.26 m (69 ft 9 in)
- Draft: 8.08–8.23 m (26 ft 6 in – 27 ft 0 in)
- Installed power: 12 × fire-tube boilers; 8,300 indicated horsepower (6,200 kW)
- Propulsion: 2 × compound steam engines; 2 × screw propellers
- Speed: 15 to 15.5 kn (27.8 to 28.7 km/h; 17.3 to 17.8 mph)
- Range: 3,100 nmi (5,700 km; 3,600 mi) at 10 kn (19 km/h; 12 mph)
- Complement: 689 men
- Armament: 4 × 340 mm (13.4 in) guns; 4 × 270 mm (10.8 in) guns; 6 × 140 mm (5.5 in) guns; 8 × 37 mm (1.5 in) Hotchkiss revolver cannon; 5 × 356 mm (14 in) torpedo tubes
- Armor: Belt: 178 to 381 mm (7 to 15 in); Casemate: 241 mm (9.5 in); Deck: 61 mm (2.4 in)

The Dévastation was an Dévastation-class ironclad of the French Navy of central battery design. She was built in the late 1870s and early 1880s. The ship was an enlarged version of the earlier ironclad Redoutable, carrying a heavier main battery. Dévastation and her sister ship Courbet were the largest central-battery ironclads ever built by any navy. They were armed with eight large-caliber guns, four 340 mm (13.4 in) weapons and four 270 mm (10.8 in) guns, the former in the central, armored battery and the latter in open barbettes on the upper deck. They were capable of steaming at a speed of around 15 knots (28 km/h; 17 mph).

After entering service in 1882, Dévastation completed sea trials, but almost immediately returned to the shipyard for modifications to her guns, which were completed in 1885. She then served in the main fleet. She took part in routine training exercises and experiments in the Mediterranean Sea through the 1880s. A major accident involving one of the 340 mm guns aboard another ship led to Dévastation having those weapons replaced by 320 mm (12.6 in) guns. She thereafter returned to routine training exercises through the mid-1890s.

Dévastation was reduced to reserve status in 1897, being reactivated only for major training exercises. The ship was heavily reconstructed between 1899 and 1902, which included an entirely new armament and propulsion system. She was transferred to the Northern Squadron, but despite the modernization, she never returned to active service. Stricken from the naval register in 1909, the ship was used in subsidiary roles, initially as a training ship. During World War I, she was converted into a prison ship. She was eventually sold to ship breakers in 1921, but ran aground while under tow in 1922. Dévastation was refloated in 1927 and scrapped.

== Design ==
Plan and profile drawing of the Dévastation class and the similar Redoutable

The Dévastation class were authorized under the naval construction Program of 1872, which began with the ironclad Redoutable that year. Shortly thereafter, Italy began work on the very large Duilio-class ironclads in the early 1870s, but the French initially ignored the development and instead chose to base the design for its next ironclad on that of Redoutable. The new ship was to be enlarged significantly to incorporate a more powerful armament. The resulting design was ordered for two vessels, Dévastation and Courbet, which were the largest central-battery ships ever built by any navy. They are sometimes called the Courbet class, as she had begun construction first, though Dévastation was launched and completed earlier.

Dévastation was 100.52 m (329 ft 9 in) long overall, with a beam of 21.26 m (69 ft 9 in) and a draft of 8.08 to 8.23 m (26 ft 6 in to 27 ft 0 in). She displaced 10,450 long tons (10,620 t). As was standard for French capital ships of the period, she had a pronounced ram bow. She was fitted with three pole masts equipped with spotting tops for her main-battery guns. The crew numbered 689 officers and enlisted men.

Her propulsion machinery consisted of two compound steam engines with steam provided by twelve coal-burning fire-tube boilers. Her engines were rated to produce 8,300 indicated horsepower (6,200 kW) for a top speed of 15 to 15.5 kn (27.8 to 28.7 km/h; 17.3 to 17.8 mph). The ship had a cruising radius of 3,100 nautical miles (5,700 km; 3,600 mi) at an economical speed of 10 knots (19 km/h; 12 mph). To supplement the steam engines, she was equipped with a three-masted full-ship rig, though this was quickly reduced to a barque rig.

Her main battery consisted of four 340 mm (13.4 in), 18-caliber guns mounted in a central, armored casemate. Two guns could fire ahead on a limited arc and two could fire astern. These were supported by a secondary battery of four 270 mm (10.8 in) guns and a tertiary battery of six 140 mm (5.5 in) guns. The 240 mm guns were in open, unarmored barbettes on the upper deck; two were placed abreast the funnels, the third forward, and the fourth gun was located aft. For defense against torpedo boats, she carried eight 37 mm (1.5 in) 1-pounder Hotchkiss revolver cannon, all in individual mounts. Her armament was rounded out with five 356 mm (14 in) torpedo tubes in above-water launchers.

The ship was protected with wrought-iron armor; her belt was 178 to 381 mm (7 to 15 in) thick and extended for the entire length of the hull. The armored casemate for the main battery was 241 mm (9.5 in) thick. On either end of the battery, an armor deck that was 61 mm (2.4 in) thick protected the ship's internal spaces; it was connected to the upper edge of the armor belt.

== Service history ==
=== Construction – 1889 ===
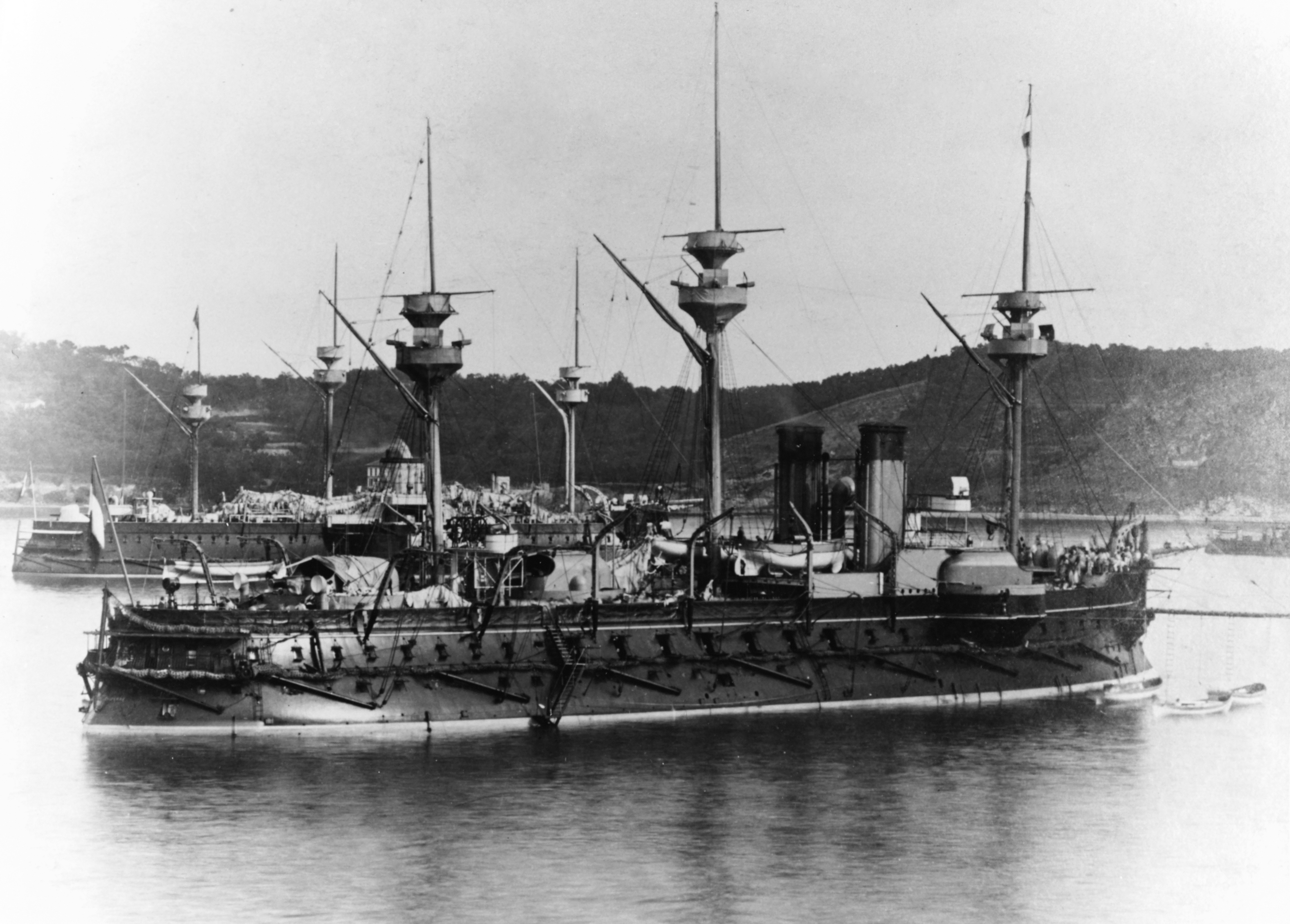
The French fleet at Villefranche-sur-Mer around 1890; Amiral Duperré is in the foreground, with Dévastation behind

The keel for Dévastation was laid down in Lorient 20 December 1875, and she was launched on 19 August 1879. The ship was placed in limited commission for sea trials in October 1881, and on full commission for active service on 15 July 1882. During her trials, her crew found the vessel difficult to steer, owing to the combination of a single rudder and two propellers, as well as her flat bottom. She proved to be a stable gun platform, however. Between December 1882 and June 1883, hydraulic mountings for the main battery guns were installed to make them easier for the crew to work. The ship finally joined the Mediterranean Fleet, the main French fleet, on 31 January 1885.

In 1886, the ship was assigned to the training squadron, and on 2–3 March 1886, she took part in experiments with torpedo boats to determine the effectiveness of various attack angles. Later on the 3rd, Dévastation and the ironclads Colbert, Friedland, Redoutable, Suffren, and Amiral Duperré conducted shooting practice using the old ironclad Armide as a target. They fired at a range of 2,700 to 4,600 m (3,000 to 5,000 yd) and scored 22 percent hits with cast-iron practice shells, though they conducted the test under unrealistic conditions, with Armide anchored in a calm sea. The year's large-scale maneuvers were held off Toulon from 10 to 17 May, and they tested the effectiveness of torpedo boats in defending the coastline from a squadron of ironclads, whether cruisers and torpedo boats could break through a blockade of ironclads, and whether a flotilla of torpedo boats could intercept ironclads at sea.

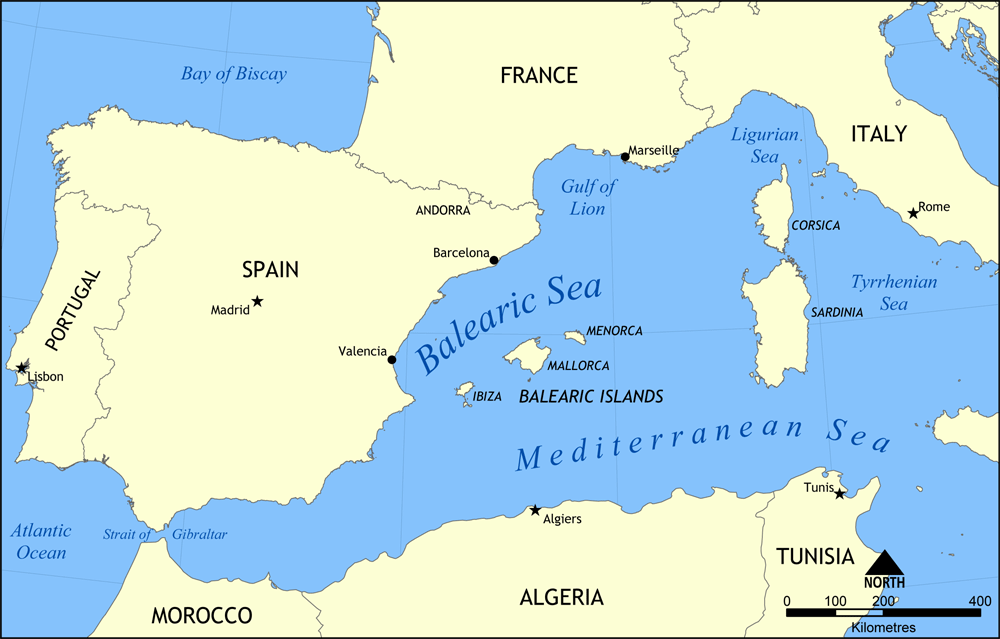
Map of the western Mediterranean, where Dévastation spent the majority of her career

Another major set of exercises was held from 2 to 12 June at Ajaccio on the island of Corsica; Dévastation and several other ironclads simulated a fleet attacking the port, which was defended by a coastal defense ship, three cruisers, and twenty torpedo boats. The ironclad squadron thereafter sailed to Oran, French Algeria, for another round of maneuvers that began on 25 June. During these exercises, the ironclads simulated an enemy fleet passing through the Strait of Gibraltar to attack the French Mediterranean coast; torpedo boats attempted to intercept them off Mallorca. From the year's maneuvers, the French concluded that the torpedo boats of the day were not sufficiently powerful enough to achieve any of the goals that had been assigned to them, particularly further from coast, but nevertheless still posed significant threats to blockading warships. These lessons spurred the development of larger torpedo boats better able to operate at sea.

In May 1887, Dévastation took part in exercises to practice convoy escort; the French Army kept significant forces in French North Africa, and these units would have to be transported back to Europe in the event of a major conflict. Dévastation, Redoutable, Trident, and Richelieu were assigned to serve as simulated troop ships, escorted by Courbet, Colbert, Amiral Duperré, and the ironclad Indomptable. A squadron of cruisers and torpedo boats was tasked with intercepting the convoy. The convoy used bad weather to make the passage, as heavy seas kept the torpedo boats from going to sea. Dévastation participated in the 1889 fleet exercises in company with eight other ironclads and numerous smaller craft. Dévastation served as part of the simulated enemy force during the maneuvers, which lasted from 30 June to 6 July. The exercises concluded with a simulated amphibious landing at Hyères carried out by the enemy squadron on 6 July, which the defending force was unable to prevent. A second round of exercises was held later that month, beginning on 23 July. The enemy squadron conducted a simulated attack on Toulon that night, but poor weather prevented further operations and the maneuvers were cancelled later on the 24th.

=== 1890–1927 ===
Plan and profile drawing of the Dévastation as modernized

In 1890, she was allocated to the 2nd Division of the Mediterranean Squadron, along with Courbet and Redoutable. Later that year, the ship main battery guns were condemned after an accident aboard Amiral Duperré and a subsequent investigation revealed that all of the 340 mm guns in French service were defective. Dévastation went to Brest to have her guns replaced. Older 320 mm (12.6 in) 25-caliber guns that were converted from coastal artillery weapons were installed in place of the defective guns. The ship returned to service by 1891, and she participated in the fleet maneuvers that year in the 1st Division, along with Courbet and the ironclad Formidable. The maneuvers began on 23 June and lasted until 11 July, during which Dévastation operated as part of the simulated hostile force that attempted to attack the southern French coast.

The ship remained in the Mediterranean Fleet through 1893, along with her sister, Amiral Duperré, the two Amiral Baudin-class ships, and the newer ironclads Hoche and the three Marceau-class vessels. She participated in the 1893 maneuvers, now as part of the 3rd Division in company with the ironclad Neptune and Marceau. This year, Dévastation served as the divisional flagship, hosting Rear Admiral Gadaud. The maneuvers included an initial period of exercises from 1 to 10 July and then larger-scale maneuvers from 17 to 28 July. Dévastation remained in service with the Mediterranean Fleet through 1895, by which time the unit consisted of Courbet, the two Amiral Baudins, and the three Marceaus, along with several cruisers and torpedo vessels. During that year's maneuvers, which began on 1 July, the 1st Squadron conducted a training cruise and practice shooting while the Reserve Squadron mobilized its ships. The main period of exercises saw the fleet divided into three units and Dévastation was assigned to the first unit, which was tasked with effecting a rendezvous at sea with the second squadron and then attacking Ajaccio. The maneuvers concluded on 27 July.

The composition of the Mediterranean Fleet changed little in 1896, apart from the addition of the new pre-dreadnought battleship Brennus. That year's maneuvers lasted from 6 to 30 July and took place off the coast of French Algeria. By 1897, Dévastation had been reduced to the Reserve Squadron of the French fleet, which also included the ironclad Caïman, Terrible, Amiral Duperré, and Friedland. She remained in the Reserve Squadron in 1898, by which time the French Navy had begun rebuilding several of its older ironclads. As a result, the only other members of the unit were Indomptable and Amiral Duperré. She took part in the fleet maneuvers that year, which lasted from 5 to 25 July. She served as the flagship of Rear Admiral Godin during the maneuvers. In December, the ship had her mainmast removed at Brest.

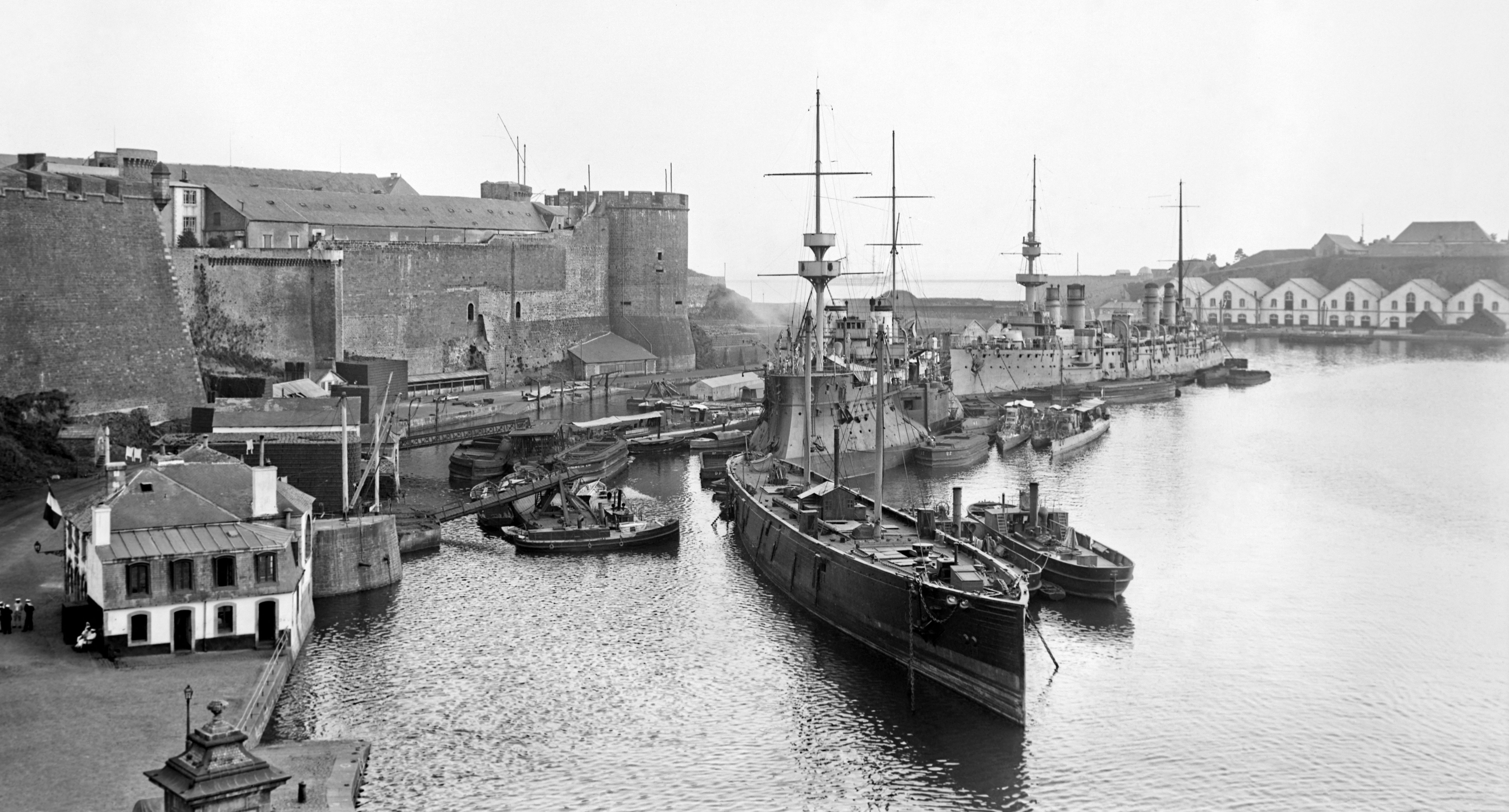
Dévastation (center) in Brest in 1912; a disarmed hulk is moored in front and one of the Leon Gambetta-class cruisers lies astern

In 1899, the ship was modernized extensively, receiving new water-tube boilers, a revised armament, and a pair of new masts with fighting tops in place of her original three. The 320 mm guns were replaced with 270 mm 20-caliber M1875 guns in the battery, and the original 270 mm guns in the barbettes were replaced with either four, or two 240 mm (9.4 in) guns. Her 140 mm guns were replaced with new 100 mm (3.9 in) guns. Later that year, she was nominally transferred to the Northern Squadron in the English Channel, along with the two Amiral Baudins, Amiral Duperré, Courbet, and Redoutable, since more modern pre-dreadnought battleships built in the mid-1890s had entered service by that time, though she remained under construction into 1901. By the time work was completed, she had also had her original propulsion system replaced with triple-expansion steam engines. Dévastation was recommissioned for sea trials on 10 March 1902, but she was never placed in full commission.

Dévastation was struck from the naval register on 5 February 1909 and thereafter attached to the 2nd Depot based at Brest. She was used as a training ship for engine room personnel from 1910 to 1911, thereafter being used to support the protected cruiser Châteaurenault to train boatswains from 1911 to 1912. Dévastation was removed from service by April 1913 and towed to Landévennec, where she was laid up for a year. In July 1914, she was towed to Lorient for torpedo tests. From October, she was used as a prison ship for prisoners of war taken during World War I. She served in that capacity through the end of the war, into 1919. In May 1921, the French navy sold Dévastation to a Paris-based firm that in turn sold the vessel to shipbreakers in Hamburg, Germany. She was taken under tow on 7 May 1922 along with the old coastal defense ship Tonnerre, but while she was leaving Lorient, Dévastation ran hard aground and could not be immediately freed. A lengthy salvage operation ensued, and she was eventually refloated on 18 April 1927. The ship was then intentionally grounded at Port-Louis, where she was broken up in situ.
