= Kathleen Corbet =

American businesswoman

Kathleen Ann Corbet (born 1960) is an American businesswoman best known for her controversial tenure as president of credit rating agency Standard & Poor's from 2004 to 2007.

== Career ==
Corbet graduated from Boston College with a B.S. in Marketing and Computer Science and received her M.B.A. in Finance from New York University's Stern School of Business. She is a member of the Council on Foreign Relations. At Boston College, she serves as aboard member on The Boston College Wall Street Council and on the Board of Trustees of Boston College.

=== Standard and Poor's ===
She served as president of Standard & Poor's (S&P), a subsidiary of S&P Global, formerly McGraw-Hill Financial Companies Inc. and a holding company of CRISIL Ltd. (Credit Rating Information Services of India Ltd.) from April 19, 2004 to August 30, 2007. During her tenure at S&P, McGraw-Hill's shares soared. She resigned on September 14, 2007 and was replaced by MHP executive Deven Sharma. McGraw-Hill spokesman, Steven Weiss, said "Mrs. Corbet's departure wasn't related to criticism of its subprime-bond ratings."

She was seen as one of the key 25 people responsible for the 2008 financial crisis. In September 2013 TIME named Corbet one of the "10 to remember".

== History ==
Corbet was elected as the vice chairman to Tom Ferguson for the Waveny LifeCare Network.

Corbet was elected as a Class I director of Clearwater Analytics Holdings, Inc in 2022
