= Courbet (company) =

French jewelry business

- Company type: Société par actions simplifiée
- Industry: Jewelry
- Founded: 2018; 8 years ago
- Founder: Manuel Mallen; Marie-Ann Wachtmeister
- Headquarters: Paris, France
- Revenue: 2 million euros (2019)
- Number of employees: 20 (2020)
- Website: https://www.en.courbet.com/

Courbet is a French jewelry business founded in 2018 by Manuel Mallen and Marie-Ann Wachtmeister.

Courbet uses only lab-grown diamonds and recycled gold, which comes mainly from old smartphones and laptops, in order to create their jewellery.

The firm's manufacturing sites run on sustainable energy and are located in Russia and the United States. Since November 2019, Courbet also buys diamonds produced in France by the French business Diam Concept.

== History ==
Courbet was founded in 2018 by entrepreneur Manuel Mallen and designer Marie-Ann Wachtmeister, and has Chanel among its shareholders.

The Courbet showroom is in Place Vendôme. It is named after the French painter Gustave Courbet, who participated to the Vendôme column’s destruction in 1871.

In May 2019 the firm opened a corner in the Printemps Haussmann department store.

In June 2019, Courbet sold a ring with a 9 carats diamond which was then the biggest lab-grown round shape diamond ever made.

In November 2019, Courbet started the « Ponts des Arts » collection made of French made diamonds, in collaboration with the startup Diam Concept founded by Alix Gicquel. Each piece of the collection has a lock on it, referring to the love locks on the pont des Arts in Paris.

In May 2020, the company raised 8 million euros thanks to the farm investment firm Raise Ventures, and the Chinese communication agency Hylink. This fund raising aimed to develop online sales, research and diamonds manufacturing in France. It also supported the firm's development in China, in particular, the opening of a subsidiary in Shanghai in May 2021.

Courbet also received the Butterfly Mark from the independent organisation Positive Luxury, certifying that the brand is operating in line with the highest standards of sustainability across the entire value chain.

In 2021, Courbet asked for a carbon report, and obtained a result of 20 kg CO_{2} per carat for diamonds cut and produced in France.
