= Jeanine Corbet =

American filmmaker

Jeanine Corbet is an American filmmaker.

Her work has been screened at the Institute for Contemporary Arts and the Anthology Film Archives. She has been a guest lecturer at several universities including Columbia University, Wesleyan, Earlham, Antioch, and SUNY Buffalo.

Her first feature documentary Butterflies and Hurricanes premiered in 2006 and was screened at the Reel Women International Film Festival under the banner of Film Fatale Productions.

She recently completed her second feature documentary entitled The Godmother which profiles Rain Storm a.k.a. Fred Gorski and his cosmetic gender transformation salon Fairplay.

She received her B.A. from SUNY Purchase Women's Studies Department and has a background in film/video post-production. She has worked for various companies in this role including the Manhattan District Attorney's Video Unit and with filmmaker Lech Kowalski.

She is currently the Director of Production Facilities and an adjunct professor for the Department of Media Culture at the College of Staten Island, a CUNY College.
