= French ironclad Courbet =

Battleship of the French Navy

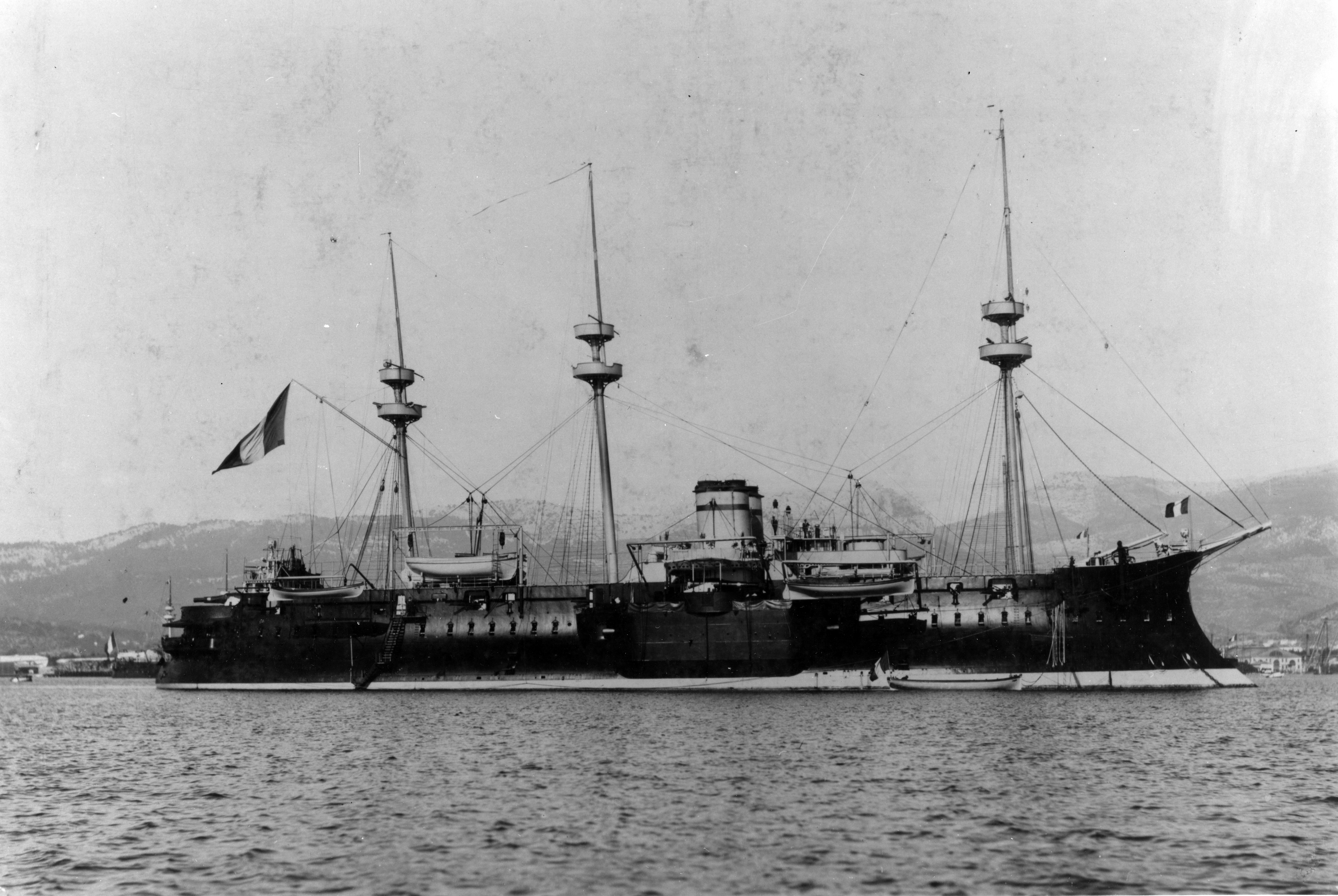
- Courbet in Toulon, probably in the early 1890s

History

France
- Name: Courbet
- Namesake: Amédée Courbet
- Laid down: 19 July 1875
- Launched: 27 April 1882, as Foudroyant
- Commissioned: 20 October 1886, as Courbet
- Decommissioned: 4 January 1903
- Stricken: 5 February 1909
- Fate: Sold for scrap, 25 August 1910

General characteristics
- Class & type: Dévastation-class ironclad
- Type: central battery ship
- Displacement: 10,450 long tons (10,620 t)
- Length: 100.52 m (329 ft 9 in) (loa)
- Beam: 21.26 m (69 ft 9 in)
- Draft: 8.08–8.23 m (26 ft 6 in – 27 ft 0 in)
- Installed power: 12 × fire-tube boilers; 8,300 indicated horsepower (6,200 kW)
- Propulsion: 2 × compound steam engines; 2 × screw propellers
- Speed: 15 to 15.5 kn (27.8 to 28.7 km/h; 17.3 to 17.8 mph)
- Range: 3,100 nmi (5,700 km; 3,600 mi) at 10 kn (19 km/h; 12 mph)
- Complement: 689 men
- Armament: 4 × 340 mm (13.4 in) guns; 4 × 270 mm (10.8 in) guns; 6 × 140 mm (5.5 in) guns; 12 × 37 mm (1.5 in) Hotchkiss revolver cannon; 5 × 356 mm (14 in) torpedo tubes
- Armor: Belt: 178 to 381 mm (7 to 15 in); Casemate: 241 mm (9.5 in); Deck: 61 mm (2.4 in)

Courbet was an Dévastation-class ironclad of the French Navy, designed as a central-battery ship. Originally named Foudroyant, she was built between 1875 and 1885, and was renamed to honor Admiral Amédée Courbet, who had recently died. The ship was an enlarged version of the earlier ironclad Redoutable, carrying a heavier main battery. Courbet and her sister ship Dévastation were the largest central-battery ironclads ever built by any navy. They were armed with eight large-caliber guns, four 340 mm (13.4 in) weapons and four 270 mm (10.8 in) guns, the former in the central armored battery and the latter in open barbettes on the upper deck. They were capable of steaming at a speed of around 15 knots (28 km/h; 17 mph).

Following lengthy sea trials, Courbet entered service in 1887 with the Mediterranean Fleet. She took part in routine training exercises and experiments with the rest of the fleet through the 1880s. During one such set of maneuvers in 1889, Courbet accidentally collided with the cruiser D'Estrées, inflicting serious damage on the latter vessel. Another mishap occurred during the 1890 maneuvers when Courbet's rudder broke off. A major accident involving one of the 340 mm guns aboard another ship in 1890 led to Courbet having those weapons replaced by 320 mm (13 in) guns. She thereafter returned to routine training exercises through the mid-1890s.

During fleet exercises in 1895, Courbet ran aground, but she was not seriously damaged in the accident. She had new water-tube boilers installed in 1898, and she was thereafter moved to the Northern Squadron. The ship took part in training maneuvers for the next several years, including a cruise to visit Spain and Portugal in 1899 and large-scale exercises combined with the Mediterranean Fleet in 1901 and 1902. Courbet was placed in reserve in 1904, subsequently being sold to ship breakers in 1910.

== Design ==
Plan and profile drawing of the Dévastation class and the similar Redoutable

The Dévastation class were authorized under the naval construction Program of 1872, which began with the ironclad Redoutable that year. Shortly thereafter, Italy began work on the very large Duilio-class ironclads in the early 1870s, but the French initially ignored the development and instead chose to base the design for its next ironclad on that of Redoutable. The new ship was to be enlarged significantly to incorporate a more powerful armament. The resulting design was ordered for two vessels, Dévastation and Courbet, which were the largest central-battery ships ever built by any navy. They are sometimes called the Courbet class, as she had begun construction first, though Dévastation was launched and completed earlier.

Courbet was 100.52 m (329 ft 9 in) long overall, with a beam of 21.26 m (69 ft 9 in) and a draft of 8.08 to 8.23 m (26 ft 6 in to 27 ft 0 in). She displaced 10,450 long tons (10,620 t). As was standard for French capital ships of the period, she had a pronounced ram bow. She was fitted with three pole masts equipped with spotting tops for her main-battery guns. The crew numbered 689 officers and enlisted men.

Her propulsion machinery consisted of two compound steam engines with steam provided by twelve coal-burning fire-tube boilers. Her engines were rated to produce 8,300 indicated horsepower (6,200 kW) for a top speed of 15 to 15.5 kn (27.8 to 28.7 km/h; 17.3 to 17.8 mph). The ship had a cruising radius of 3,100 nautical miles (5,700 km; 3,600 mi) at an economical speed of 10 knots (19 km/h; 12 mph). To supplement the steam engines, she was initially equipped with a three-masted schooner rig, though this was quickly removed.

Her main battery consisted of four 340 mm (13.4 in), 21-caliber guns mounted in a central, armored casemate. Two guns could fire ahead on a limited arc and two could fire astern. These were supported by a secondary battery of four 270 mm (10.8 in) guns and a tertiary battery of six 5.46 in (138.6 mm) guns. The 240 mm guns were in open, unarmored barbettes on the upper deck; two were placed abreast the funnels, the third forward, and the fourth gun was located aft. For defense against torpedo boats, she carried twelve 37 mm (1.5 in) 1-pounder Hotchkiss revolver cannon, all in individual mounts. Her armament was rounded out with five 356 mm (14 in) torpedo tubes in above-water launchers. She also carried a pair of 65 mm (2.6 in) field guns for use by landing parties.

The ship was protected with wrought-iron armor; her belt was 178 to 381 mm (7 to 15 in) thick and extended for the entire length of the hull. The armored casemate for the main battery were 241 mm (9.5 in) thick. On either end of the battery, an armor deck that was 61 mm (2.4 in) thick protected the ship's internal spaces; it was connected to the upper edge of the armor belt.

=== Modifications ===
Courbet was modernized several times throughout her career. In 1894, her light armament was revised to include eighteen 65 mm (2.6 in) guns and seven 37 mm revolver cannon. More extensive work was carried out in 1897, when the ship received a new, larger conning tower with 80 mm (3.1 in) of armor plate on the sides. The light guns that had been present in her upper fighting tops were removed, as were the two forward torpedo tubes. In addition, the gun shields fitted to the barbette guns were replaced with vertical armor plates on the front. The ship also received new fire-tube boilers to replace the worn-out boilers. The Navy had intended to completely rearm the ship, but a change in naval ministers led to a shift in priorities, so the alterations to the main and secondary batteries were deferred. Additional work was carried out between September 1899 and December 1900. Her existing masts and bowsprit were removed, and two larger military masts with two fighting tops apiece were installed in their place. Her 270 mm guns were removed; the bow position received a 138.6 mm (5.46 in) 30-caliber M1881/84 gun, while the three barbette positions had 240 mm 40-caliber M1893 guns. Her light battery was revised again slightly, to sixteen of the 47 mm guns, eight 37 mm revolvers, and two 37 mm guns.

== Service history ==
=== Construction – 1890 ===
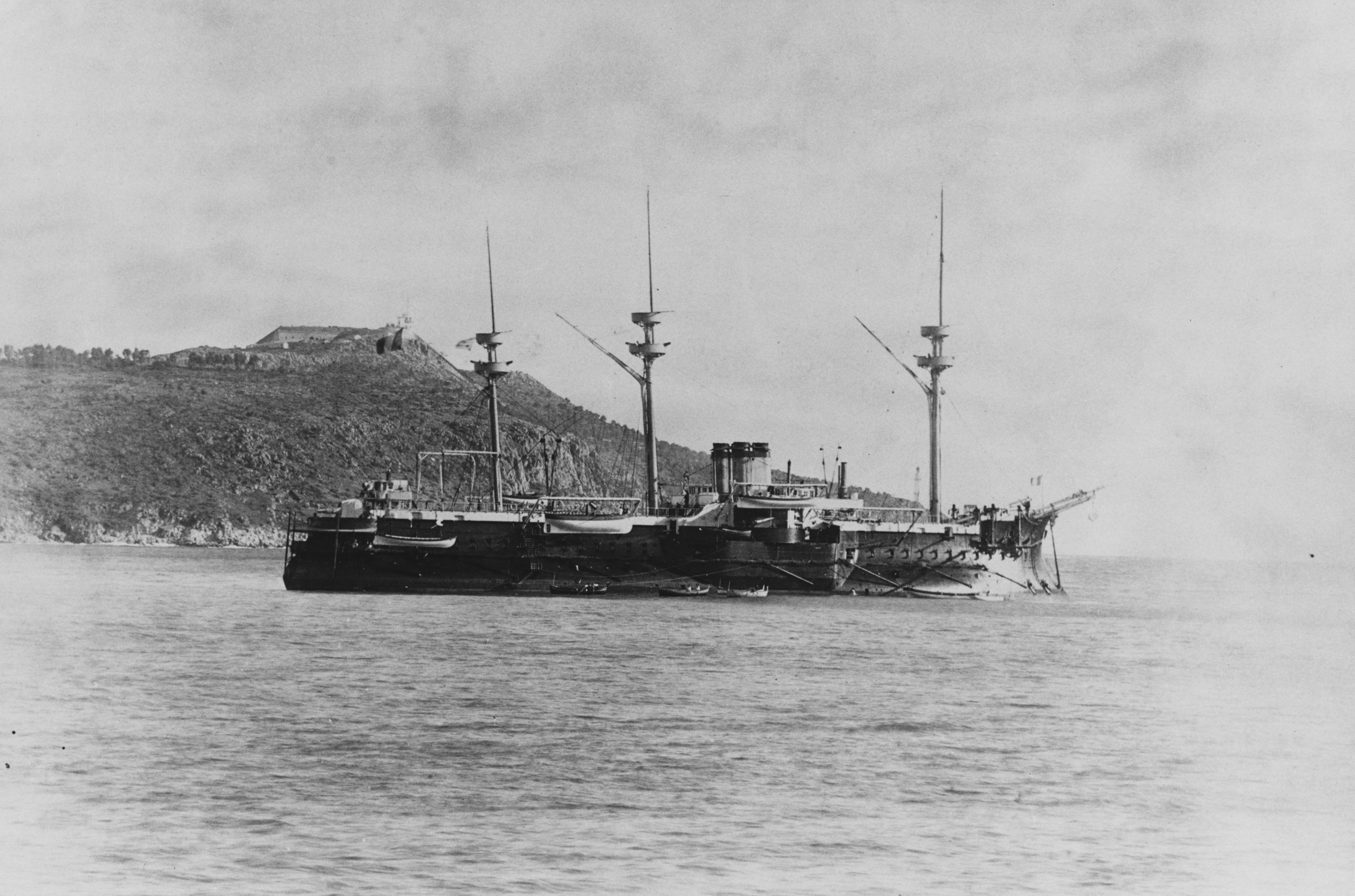
Courbet off Villefranche-sur-Mer

The ship was laid down at Toulon on 19 July 1875, and was launched on 27 April 1882. After she had been launched, she broke from her mooring in a strong wind and ran aground. Originally named Foudroyant ("Lightning"), she was renamed to honor Admiral Amédée Courbet on 25 June 1885, who had died of cholera after leading French naval forces through much of the Sino-French War. The ship was commissioned on 1 August 1885 for sea trials, and in December, she had her armament installed. Trials were conducted off Toulon into 1886, and she was placed in full commission on 1 October, though trials continued until 18 March 1887. She thereafter joined the Mediterranean Fleet. In May 1887, Courbet took part in exercises to practice convoy escort; the French Army kept significant forces in French North Africa, and these units would have to be transported back to Europe in the event of a major conflict. The ship was assigned to escort a convoy of four simulated troop ships, along with the ironclads Colbert, Amiral Duperré and Indomptable. A squadron of cruisers and torpedo boats was tasked with intercepting the convoy. The convoy used bad weather to make the passage, as heavy seas kept the torpedo boats from going to sea. In August, she represented France at the International Maritime Exhibition at Cádiz, before visiting Tangier.

Courbet participated in the 1889 fleet exercises in company with eight other ironclads and numerous smaller craft. She served as part of the simulated enemy force during the maneuvers, which lasted from 30 June to 6 July. On 3 July, Courbet conducted a simulated bombardment of Saint-Cyr-sur-Mer and La Ciotat. During the maneuvers, Courbet accidentally collided with the old unprotected cruiser D'Estrées, badly damaging her. Courbet and the torpedo cruiser Condor escorted D'Estrées back to Toulon on 4 July. The next day, Courbet and several other vessels attacked Cette. The exercises concluded with a simulated amphibious landing at Hyères carried out by the enemy squadron on 6 July, which the defending force was unable to prevent. A second round of exercises was held later that month, beginning on 23 July. The enemy squadron conducted a simulated attack on Toulon that night, but poor weather prevented further operations and the maneuvers were cancelled later on the 24th.

Joint maneuvers were held in 1890 with the combined Mediterranean Fleet and Northern Squadron. Courbet served in the 1st Division of the 1st Squadron, which also included Amiral Duperré, the ironclad Formidable, the protected cruisers Sfax and Forbin, and four smaller torpedo craft. The ships of the Mediterranean Fleet arrived in Brest on 2 July and began the maneuvers four days later; the exercises ended on 25 July. A series of mechanical problems and accidents plagued the vessels of the combined fleet; on 22 July, Courbet's rudder broke off and the ship was out of action for a day while repairs were carried out. Three days later, Courbet had to come to the assistance of the torpedo gunboat Dague, which was unable to steam after the feed pump for her boilers broke down. Several other vessels suffered from similar problems. Later that year, she was transferred to the 2nd Division of the Mediterranean Fleet, along with Dévastation and Redoutable. That year, the ship main battery guns were condemned after an accident aboard Amiral Duperré and a subsequent investigation revealed that all of the 340 mm guns in French service were defective. Courbet had her guns replaced with weapons of the older M1875 version, though they were the same diameter and length as the defective guns.

=== 1891–1910 ===
Plan and profile drawing of Dévastation as modernized

Courbet again participated in the fleet maneuvers of 1891 in the 1st Division, along with Dévastation and Formidable. The maneuvers began on 23 June and lasted until 11 July, during which Courbet operated as part of the "French" fleet, opposing a simulated hostile force that attempted to attack the southern French coast. The ship remained in the Mediterranean Fleet in 1893, along with her sister, Amiral Duperré, the two Amiral Baudin-class ships, and the newer ironclads Hoche and the three Marceau-class vessels. That year, she sailed to the eastern Mediterranean. She participated in the 1893 maneuvers, again as part of the 1st Division in company with Formidable and Redoutable. The maneuvers included an initial period of exercises from 1 to 10 July and then larger-scale maneuvers from 17 to 28 July. Courbet was docked in Toulon in 1894 for modernization, which included the replacement of her six old 138.6 mm guns with ten new model weapons of the same caliber. Fourteen 47 mm (1.9 in) guns were also added to the light armament, and the number of 37 mm revolvers was reduced to seven.

Courbet remained in service with the Mediterranean Fleet through 1895, by which time the unit consisted of Dévastation, the two Amiral Baudins, and the three Marceaus, along with several cruisers and torpedo vessels. The ship visited Tunisia and Algeria that year. During that year's maneuvers, which began on 1 July, the 1st Squadron conducted a training cruise and practice shooting while the Reserve Squadron mobilized its ships. The main period of exercises saw the fleet divided into three units and Courbet was assigned to the first unit, which was tasked with effecting a rendezvous at sea with the second squadron and then attacking Ajaccio. The maneuvers concluded on 27 July. On 13 November 1895, while the fleet was steaming into Hyères, Formidable turned too widely and led the line of ironclads into shallow water. Several of the vessels ran aground, including Courbet, which was the fourth vessel in line. She remained stuck fast for two days before she could be pulled free, though she was not damaged in the accident. The composition of the Mediterranean Fleet changed little in 1896, apart from the addition of the new pre-dreadnought battleship Brennus. That year's maneuvers lasted from 6 to 30 July and took place off the coast of French Algeria. She remained in the unit in 1897. In April, she was dry-docked for another modernization that lasted until June.

The ship began 1898 in the Mediterranean Fleet, which now included four pre-dreadnoughts and three other ironclads, but she was decommissioned in February to refit, which included the installation of new water-tube boilers. According to the contemporary journal The Naval Annual, the main battery guns were replaced with 270 mm guns, but according to both Campbell and Roberts, these guns were only installed aboard Dévastation. In October 1898 sailed from Toulon to Cherbourg, where she joined the l'escadre du Nord ("Northern Squadron"). In 1899, she visited Lisbon, Portugal, and Cádiz, Vigo, and Ferrol, Spain. In 1901, Courbet again served with the Northern Squadron, along with Hoche, the two Amiral Baudins, and the pre-dreadnoughts Carnot, Masséna, and Iéna. Courbet made another stop in Vigo that year, and also stopped in Lagos, Portugal, and Toulon and Ajaccio. During the fleet maneuvers that year, the Northern Squadron steamed south for joint maneuvers with the Mediterranean Fleet. The Northern Squadron ships formed part of the hostile force, and as it was entering the Mediterranean from the Atlantic, represented a German squadron attempting to meet its Italian allies. The exercises began on 3 July and concluded on 28 July. In August and September, the Northern Squadron conducted amphibious assault exercises. On 28 August, they escorted a group of troop ships from Brest to La Rochelle, which the ships bombarded, neutralized the coastal defenses, and put some 6,000 men ashore.

In early 1902, the Northern Squadron was reorganized, leaving Courbet, Masséna, and Formidable in the unit that year, along with four coastal defense ships. During the 1902 fleet maneuvers, which began on 7 July, the Northern Squadron attempted to force a passage through the Strait of Gibraltar. The squadron was unable to effect the passing unobserved by the Mediterranean Squadron's cruisers, but the Northern Squadron commander was able to shake his pursuers long enough to prevent them from intercepting his force before the end of the exercises on 15 July. Further maneuvers with the combined fleet took place, including a simulated battle where Courbet and the other ships of the Northern Squadron represented the British Mediterranean Fleet; the exercises concluded on 5 August. She thereafter sailed from Toulon to Brest, where she was put into reserve in 1904. She was decommissioned on 21 October 1908, struck from the naval register on 5 February 1909, and sold for scrap on 25 August 1910.
