= French ironclad Redoutable =

French Navy ship

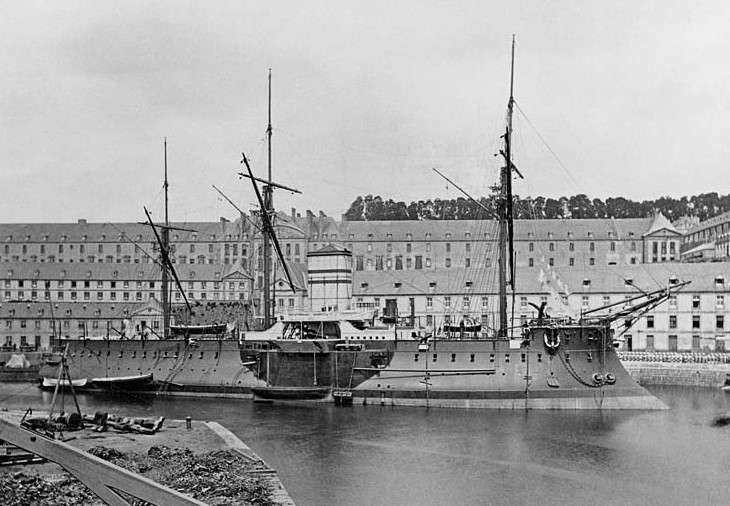
- Redoutable in her original configuration

Class overview
- Preceded by: Colbert class
- Succeeded by: Dévastation class

History

France
- Name: Redoutable
- Builder: Arsenal de Lorient
- Laid down: 18 July 1873
- Launched: 18 September 1876
- Commissioned: 22 November 1878
- Stricken: 9 March 1910
- Fate: Broken up, 1912

General characteristics
- Type: Central-battery and barbette ship
- Displacement: Normal: 8,858 t (8,718 long tons; 9,764 short tons); Full load: 9,430 t (9,280 long tons; 10,390 short tons)
- Length: 100.7 m (330 ft 5 in) (loa)
- Beam: 19.76 m (64 ft 10 in)
- Draft: 7.8 m (25 ft 7 in) (maximum)
- Installed power: 6,000 ihp (4,500 kW); 8 × fire-tube boilers
- Propulsion: 3 × compound steam engines; 1 × screw propeller
- Sail plan: Full ship rig
- Speed: 14.66 knots (27.15 km/h; 16.87 mph)
- Range: 2,840 nmi (5,260 km; 3,270 mi) at 10 kn (19 km/h; 12 mph)
- Complement: 30 officers; 679 enlisted
- Armament: 8 × 274 mm (10.8 in) guns; 6 × 138 mm (5.4 in) guns; 8 × 37 mm (1.5 in) Hotchkiss revolver cannon; 4 × torpedo tubes
- Armor: Belt: 220 to 350 mm (8.7 to 13.8 in); Battery: 300 mm (11.8 in); Deck: 60 mm (2.4 in); Conning tower: 30 mm (1.2 in)

Redoutable was an ironclad warship of the French Navy built in the 1870s. She was a hybrid central battery and barbette ship, and she was the first large warship in the world to use steel as a building material. The ship's design was heavily influenced by the French experience in the recent Franco-Prussian War, which demonstrated the need for a shallow draft, mixed sail and steam propulsion, and a heavy armament. Redoutable was armed with a uniform main battery of eight 274 mm (10.8 in) guns, half in the central battery, three in revolving barbette mounts, and the last in the bow. She provided the basis for the subsequent Dévastation-class ironclads built later in the decade.

Redoutable took part in routine training exercises through the 1880s and into the early 1890s, including shooting practice and large-scale fleet maneuvers. During this period, she operated with the Mediterranean Fleet. In the mid-1890s, the ship was modernized twice, upgrading her armament and her propulsion system. By that time, newer, more powerful pre-dreadnought battleships began to enter service, and Redoutable was eventually displaced to the Northern Squadron in the English Channel. She was deployed to East Asia in 1900 in response to the Boxer Uprising in China, and she remained in French Indochina for the next several years. She had been reduced to reserve status by 1903, stationed in Saigon. Redoutable was ultimately sold to local ship breakers in 1911 and was dismantled over the course of 1912.

== Background ==
In the midst of the French collapse during the Franco-Prussian War of 1870–1871, Vice Admiral Louis Pierre Alexis Pothuau became the naval minister in February 1871. France sued for peace the following month, and the war was formally concluded by the Treaty of Frankfurt on 10 May. In a report to the National Assembly on 19 August, the parliament member Daniel Ancel noted that the French fleet was still governed by the program that had been laid out in 1859 and that most of the required ships had been built, and he argued that a new fleet plan was needed given the French defeat just a few months earlier. In addition, the ironclad warships that had been built in the late 1850s and 1860s would soon begin to deteriorate as their wooden hulls aged. Ancel and Pothuau had already discussed the idea, and Pothuau had received a report from the Directeur du matérial (Director of Equipment) for recommendations for the new fleet program. Pothuau in turn passed the matter to the Conseil d'Amirauté (Council of the Admiralty) for further discussion and to solicit its members for comment.

On 14 September, Pothuau sent the draft program to the Conseil des travaux (Board of Construction) and instructed the board to begin drawing up a list of specifications for the ships that would be built under the plan. By November, the board had completed their proposals, by which time the construction program had been finalized. A total of 157 ships would be built, a significant reduction from the number of vessels that had been called for under the 1859 plan; this amounted to a tacit abandonment of French competition with the British Royal Navy. Instead of competing with Britain, the French fleet would now orient its forces toward coastal defense and inshore operations against Germany. Even its sea-going battleships would be capable of operating in shallower coastal waters. Furthermore, all new ships were to be the equal of foreign contemporaries. The 1872 budget, which was submitted in the Assembly in December 1871, called for the construction of one large ironclad, among a number of other smaller warships.

== Design ==
Illustration of Redoutable in her original configuration

In the course of completing Pothuau's request for specifications for new ships, the Conseil de traveaux completed its requirements for a 1st-class ironclad on 18 October 1871. The basic characteristics called for a ship that was 90 m (295 ft 3 in) long, capable of steaming at 14 knots (26 km/h; 16 mph), and armed with four 274 mm (10.8 in) and six 240 mm (9.4 in) guns in a mix of casemates and open barbettes. Pothuau decided that the armament should be altered to six 274 mm guns and five 240 mm weapons. He then forwarded the specifications to the various French shipyards and solicited more detailed proposals.

Seven firms responded to the request by 21 June 1872, when the Conseil de traveaux convened to evaluate them, ultimately selecting the proposal that had been designed by Louis de Bussy. His design allowed for six heavy guns to fire either ahead or astern, which the Conseil preferred. After revisions on 15 July and 5 November, de Bussy's design had increased in size to 95 m (312 ft) long and speed had grown slightly to 14.5 knots (26.9 km/h; 16.7 mph). The four 240 mm guns were mounted on twin rotating platforms, which were placed side by side so they could both fire forward. De Bussy had also decided to incorporate steel into the hull, using it for the structural frames and much of the outer hull plating, although much of the underwater skin was iron instead. She was the first major warship to use steel as a major building material, predating any British steel warship by two years, in large part due to the superiority of the French iron industry at that time.

French lessons from the conflict with Prussia also influenced the design; de Bussy noted that because "in our epoch a battleship must more often operate on coasts than on the high seas", he adopted a full-ship rig, since the French blockade of Prussian ports had been significantly hampered by the need to continuously replenish coal stocks off Heligoland. Draft was reduced to permit use of the new ship close to shore, and a number of smaller guns were planned for use against coastal fortifications.

On 5 November, De Bussy argued that major revisions were needed, mainly due to his perception that the 240 mm gun was insufficiently powerful. He proposed increasing the 274 mm guns to 305 mm (12 in) but reducing the number of barrels from six to four; the 240 mm weapons in turn replaced by 274 mm guns, which were distributed in four single mounts, rather than in the two pairs. The weight savings obtained would then be used to increase armor protection. The 305 mm gun was a new weapon, and so four 274 mm guns were substituted in the battery and a pair of 320 mm (13 in) M1870 guns would be mounted on the upper deck. Pothuau approved the plan on 14 November.

The finalized design was approved on 14 November 1873, by which time work on the ship had already begun. Further revisions were made during construction, including an increase in the belt armor from 300 to 350 mm (11.8 to 13.8 in) in July 1875. In addition, the main battery was changed to a uniform armament of eight 274 mm guns. Redoutable proved to be a successful, influential design, as many subsequent French capital ships copied most of her features, including her immediate successors, the two Dévastation-class ships.

=== General characteristics and machinery ===
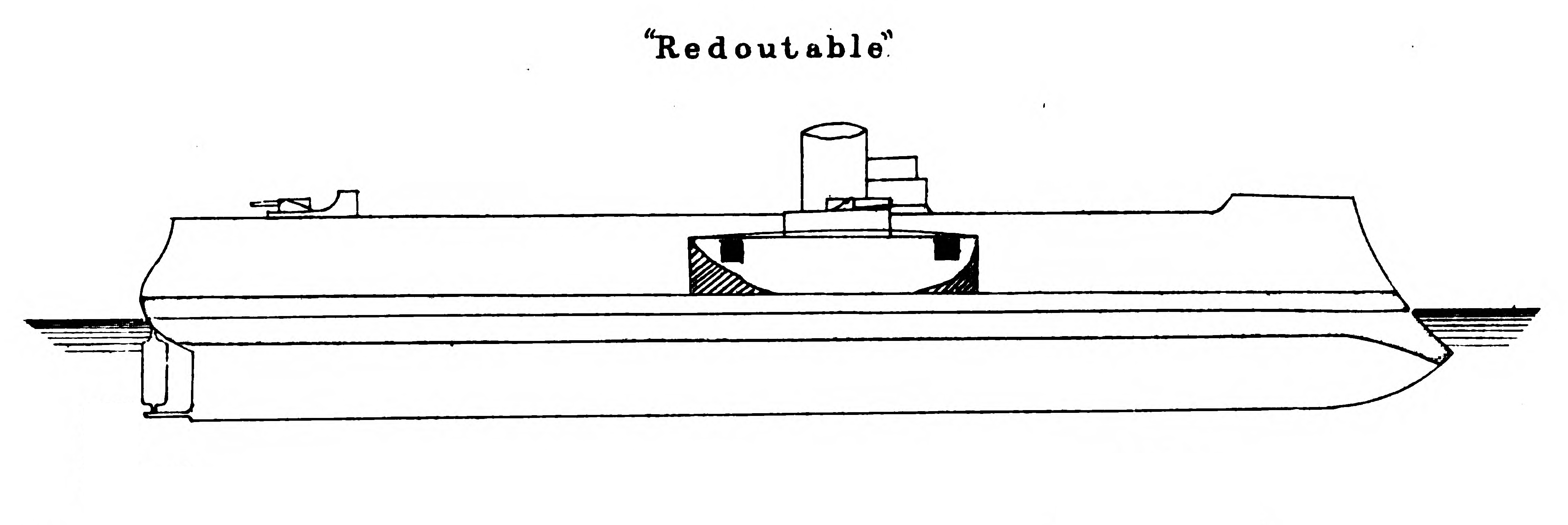
Profile sketch of Redoutable, The Naval Annual, 1887

Redoutable was 95 m (311 ft 8 in) long between perpendiculars, 96.67 m (317 ft 2 in) long at the waterline, and 100.7 m (330 ft 5 in) long overall. She had a beam of 19.76 m (64 ft 10 in) and an average draft of 7.28 m (23 ft 11 in), which increased to 7.8 m (25 ft 7 in) aft. She displaced 8,858 t (8,718 long tons; 9,764 short tons) normally, which increased to 9,430 t (9,280 long tons; 10,390 short tons) at full load. As was standard for French capital ships of the period, she had a pronounced tumblehome shape and a prominent ram bow. The ship had a short forecastle at the bow and a raised platform amidships that included a small conning tower and a walkway above the main battery guns. Her hull included a double bottom for resistance to damage below the waterline, but it lacked any watertight compartmentalization. Her metacentric height measured 0.85 m (2.8 ft). The crew numbered 30 officers and 679 enlisted men.

Her propulsion machinery consisted of three compound steam engines driving a single screw propeller. Each engine consisted of a pair of cylinders that could be decoupled so that reduced power could be applied for greater efficiency at lower speeds. The engines were manufactured by Schneider et Cie. Steam was provided by eight coal-burning fire-tube boilers that were vented through a single large funnel.

Redoutable's engines were rated to produce 6,000 indicated horsepower (4,500 kW), and on her initial speed trials, the system produced 6,071 ihp (4,527 kW) for a top speed of 14.66 kn (27.15 km/h; 16.87 mph). Coal storage capacity amounted to 492 t (484 long tons; 542 short tons). The ship had a cruising radius of 2,840 nautical miles (5,260 km; 3,270 mi) at an economical speed of 10 knots (19 km/h; 12 mph). To supplement the steam engines, she was equipped with a three-masted full-ship rig.

=== Armament and armor ===
Redoutable was armed with a main battery of eight 274 mm (10.8 in) M1875, 19.75-caliber guns. Four of these were carried in the central battery in armored casemates, which was sponsoned out over the hull to allow the guns to fire directly ahead or astern. Two more guns were in open barbette mounts placed on the upper deck atop the battery; one was in the forecastle, and the last was on the upper deck at the stern. The three upper-deck guns were fitted with armored gun shields. The positioning of the guns emphasized all-around firing, which came at the cost of limited broadside firepower, which meant that under most bearings, only one battery gun could engage a single target.

The main guns were supported by a secondary battery of six 138 mm (5.4 in) guns, all of which were placed on the upper deck; one pair was located ahead of the battery and the other two pairs were placed aft of it. Close-range defense was provided by a tertiary battery of eight 37 m (121 ft) Hotchkiss revolver cannon. Her armament was rounded out by four torpedo tubes that were in the hull above the waterline, two per side.

The ship's armor consisted of wrought iron. Her belt armor covered the entire length of the hull. It was 350 mm (13.8 in) in the central section of the ship, where it protected the ammunition magazines and the propulsion machinery spaces. Toward the bow, the belt tapered down to 220 m (721.8 ft), and the stern section was reduced to 230 mm (9.1 in). The belt extended from 1.52 m (5 ft 0 in) below the waterline to 1.28 m (4 ft 2 in) above the line. Directly above the belt, the main battery guns were protected with 300 mm (11.8 in) of iron armor on the sides, which were connected at either end by transverse bulkheads that were 150 mm (5.9 in) thick.

The forward section of the ship was protected by an armor deck that was 60 mm (2.4 in) and was connected to the belt; it extended from the front of the battery to the bow and from the rear of the battery to the stern. The battery itself did not have horizontal armor protection. Redoutable's conning tower received 30 mm (1.2 in) of iron plating on the sides and 10 mm (0.39 in) on the top. The main-deck gun shields were 18 mm (0.71 in) thick.

=== Modifications ===
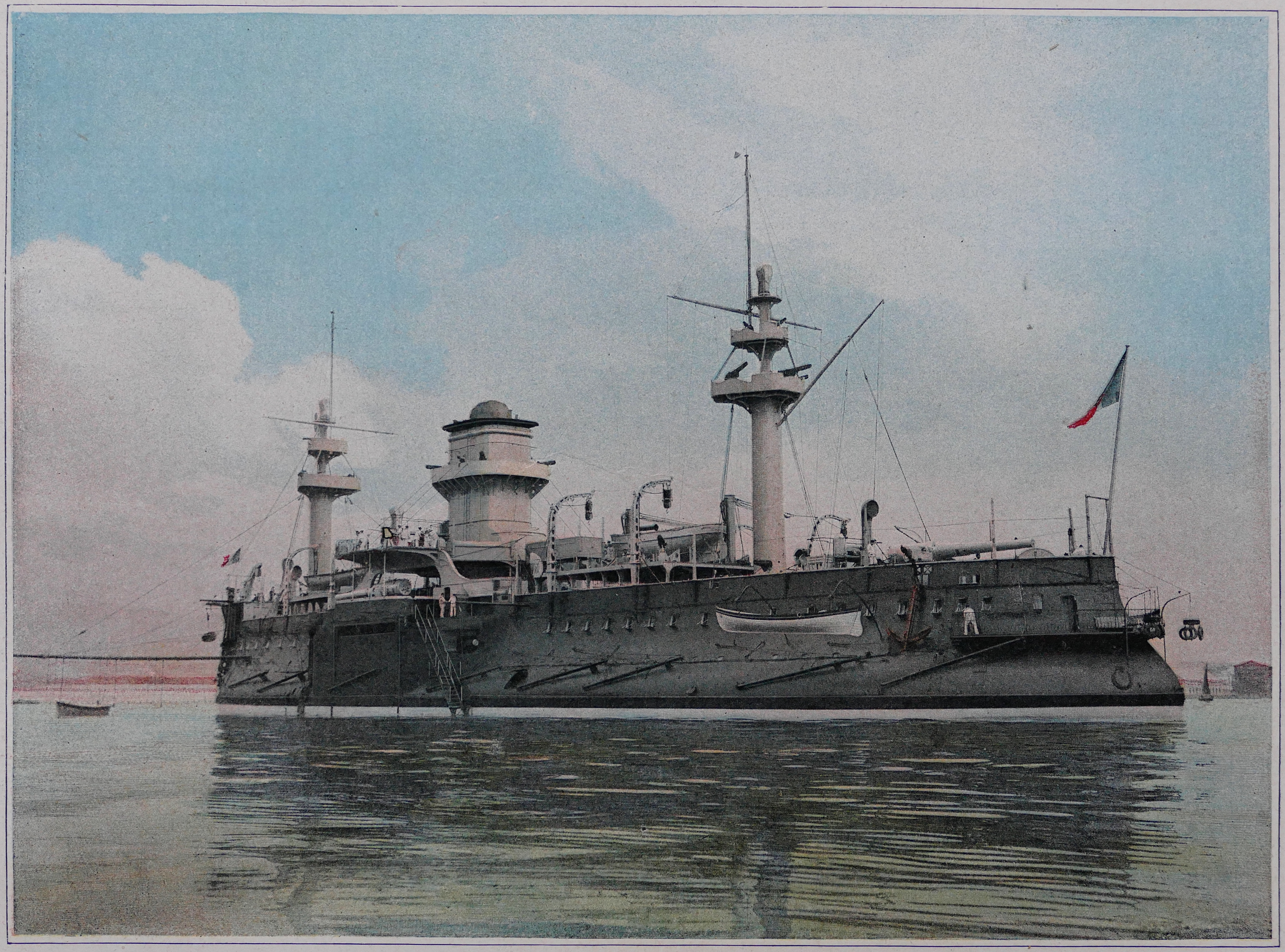
Redoutable late in her career, c. 1890s

Redoutable underwent a series of modifications and two major refits over the course of her career. Several relatively minor changes were made over the course of the 1880s. In 1882, a gun shield was added to the aft main gun, which had not originally received one. Her sailing rig was reduced slightly to a barque rig in 1883, and was cut down even further in 1886 to a barquentine rig. At that time, she also received new boilers. Two years later, her bowsprit was removed. More work in 1890 saw several light guns added to provide better defense against torpedo boats. She then carried a pair of 65 mm (2.6 in) guns, eight 47 mm (1.9 in) M1885 quick-firing (QF) guns, one 47 mm Hotchkiss revolver, and sixteen 37 mm Hotchkiss revolvers.

A more significant refit took place between 1893 and 1894 at Toulon. Redoutable's sailing rig was removed and a pair of heavy military masts were installed. Her main battery guns were replaced with newer models; the battery, amidships barbette, and bow guns were all replaced with 28.5-caliber M1881 guns, while the stern mount received an M1884 gun of 30 caliber. The existing gun mounts were retained, which meant that the longer (and thus higher velocity) guns could only be fired with reduced propellant charges. The light battery was significantly expanded, and now consisted of two 65 mm guns, fourteen 47 mm quick-firing guns, one 47 mm Hotchkiss revolver, six 37 mm M1885 quick-firing guns, and fourteen 37 mm Hotchkiss revolvers. Schneider et Cie converted the compound engines into triple-expansion steam engines by replacing the central compound engine with a high-pressure cylinder that fed steam into the remaining engines; when cruising at lower speeds, the high-pressure cylinder could be bypassed. Following the conversion, Redoutable was capable of steaming at 14.5 knots (26.9 km/h; 16.7 mph) for long periods and could reach 15 knots (28 km/h; 17 mph) for brief sprints.

A second major modernization took place in 1898, again at Toulon. The four main guns in the central battery were upgraded to the M1884 pattern, and they were fitted with new M1896 mountings. The remaining M1881 pattern guns were simply retrofitted with updated mountings. All of the 138 mm guns were replaced with 100 mm (3.9 in) M1881 QF guns. Her light guns were also moved around the ship for improved firing arcs, and they were again significantly revised. She was now fitted with four 65 mm M1891 guns, fifteen 47 mm QF guns, and two 37 mm QF guns. Two of her torpedo tubes were also removed (and the last pair would follow in 1900). A more heavily armored conning tower was installed in place of the original structure; the new tower had 60 mm (2.4 in) of steel armor on top of 20 mm (0.79 in) structural steel.

== Service ==
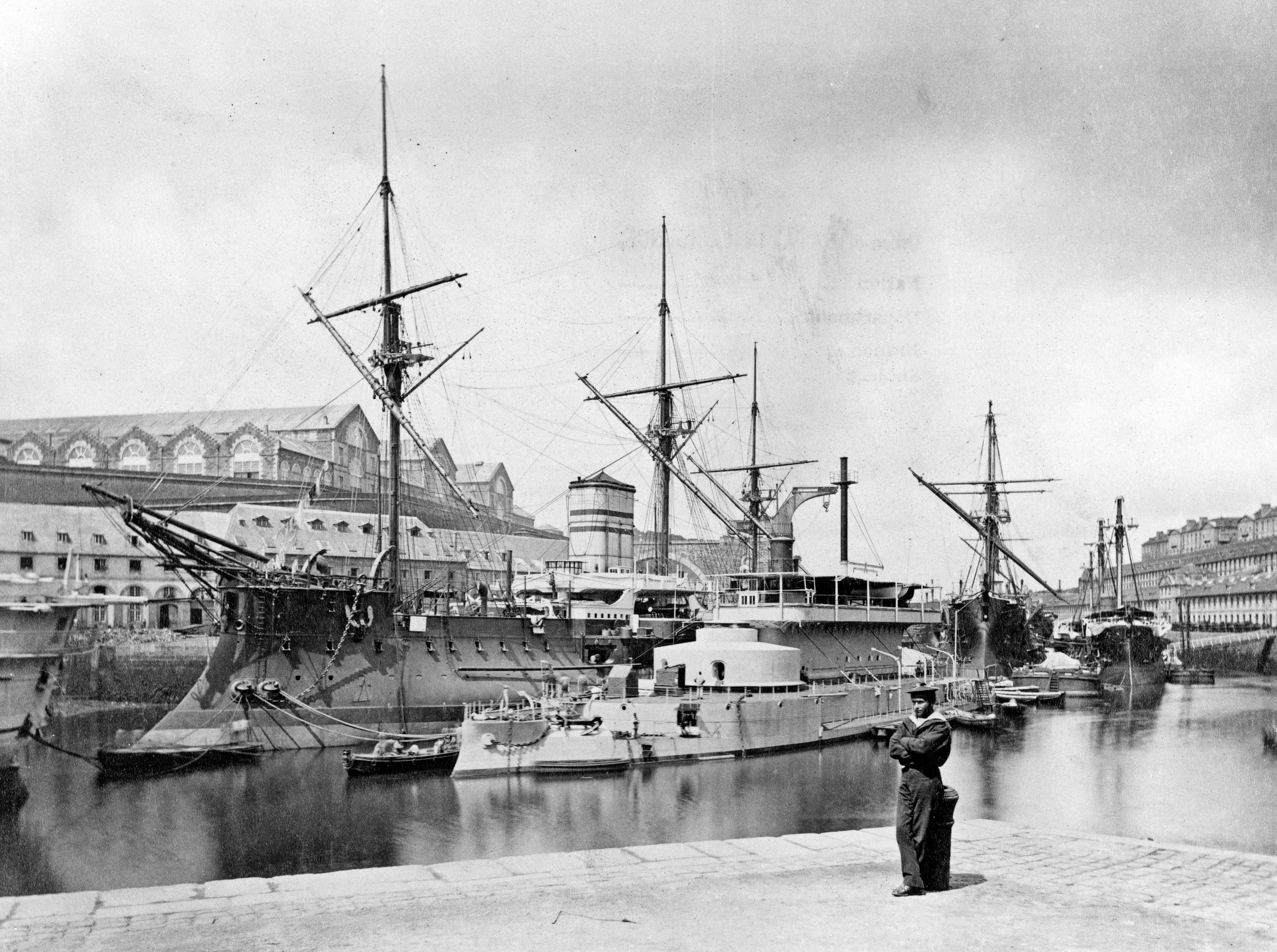
Redoutable in Brest early in her career

=== 1873–1890 ===
The keel for Redoutable was laid down on 18 July 1873 at the Arsenal de Lorient shipyard in Lorient, France. Her completed hull was launched on 18 September 1876, and after completing fitting-out work, she was commissioned in a partial capacity for sea trials on 1 August 1878. At that time, her sailing rig was not fitted, nor were some of her guns. During her initial working up period, the ship was placed in full commission on 31 December. Trials were completed on 28 January 1879, and on 24 February, the ship departed Lorient for Toulon. In March, she was assigned to the Escadre d'évolution (Training Squadron).

On 3 March 1886, Redoutable and the ironclads Colbert, Friedland, Amiral Duperré, Suffren, and Dévastation conducted shooting practice using the old ironclad Armide as a target. They fired at a range of 2,700 to 4,600 m (3,000 to 5,000 yd) and scored 22 percent hits with cast iron practice shells, though they conducted the test under unrealistic conditions, with Armide anchored in a calm sea. In May 1887, Redoutable took part in exercises to practice convoy escort; the French Army kept significant forces in French North Africa, and these units would have to be transported back to Europe in the event of a major conflict. Redoutable, Dévastation, Trident, and Richelieu were assigned to serve as simulated troop ships, escorted by Courbet, Colbert, Amiral Duperré, and the ironclad Indomptable. A squadron of cruisers and torpedo boats was tasked with intercepting the convoy. The convoy used bad weather to make the passage, as heavy seas kept the torpedo boats from going to sea. Redoutable was also present for the 1888 fleet maneuvers, the first of which lasted from 19 to 26 June. During this period, she served as part of the force defending Corsica from a larger, hostile squadron. A second set of exercises followed in from 26 August to 5 September, which simulated an attack on Toulon that flotillas of torpedo boats attempted to fend off.

Redoutable participated in the 1889 fleet maneuvers, which consisted of two phases that lasted from 30 June to 8 July and from 23 to 24 July. She served in the "enemy" squadron that simulated an attack on the French coast in the first phase, and then mounted a direct attack on Toulon on the night of the second phase. In one simulated engagement on the first day of the exercises, Redoutable, the cruiser D'Estrées, and a torpedo vessel were judged to have destroyed a flotilla of torpedo boats and successfully bombarded Bandol. During the 1890 fleet maneuvers, Redoutable served in the 3rd Division of the 2nd Squadron of the Mediterranean Fleet. At the time, the division also included the ironclads Amiral Baudin and Trident. The ships concentrated off Oran, French Algeria on 22 June and then proceeded to Brest, arriving there on 2 July for combined operations with the ships of the Northern Squadron. The exercises began four days later and concluded on 25 July, after which Redoutable and the rest of the Mediterranean Fleet returned to Toulon.

=== 1891–1912 ===
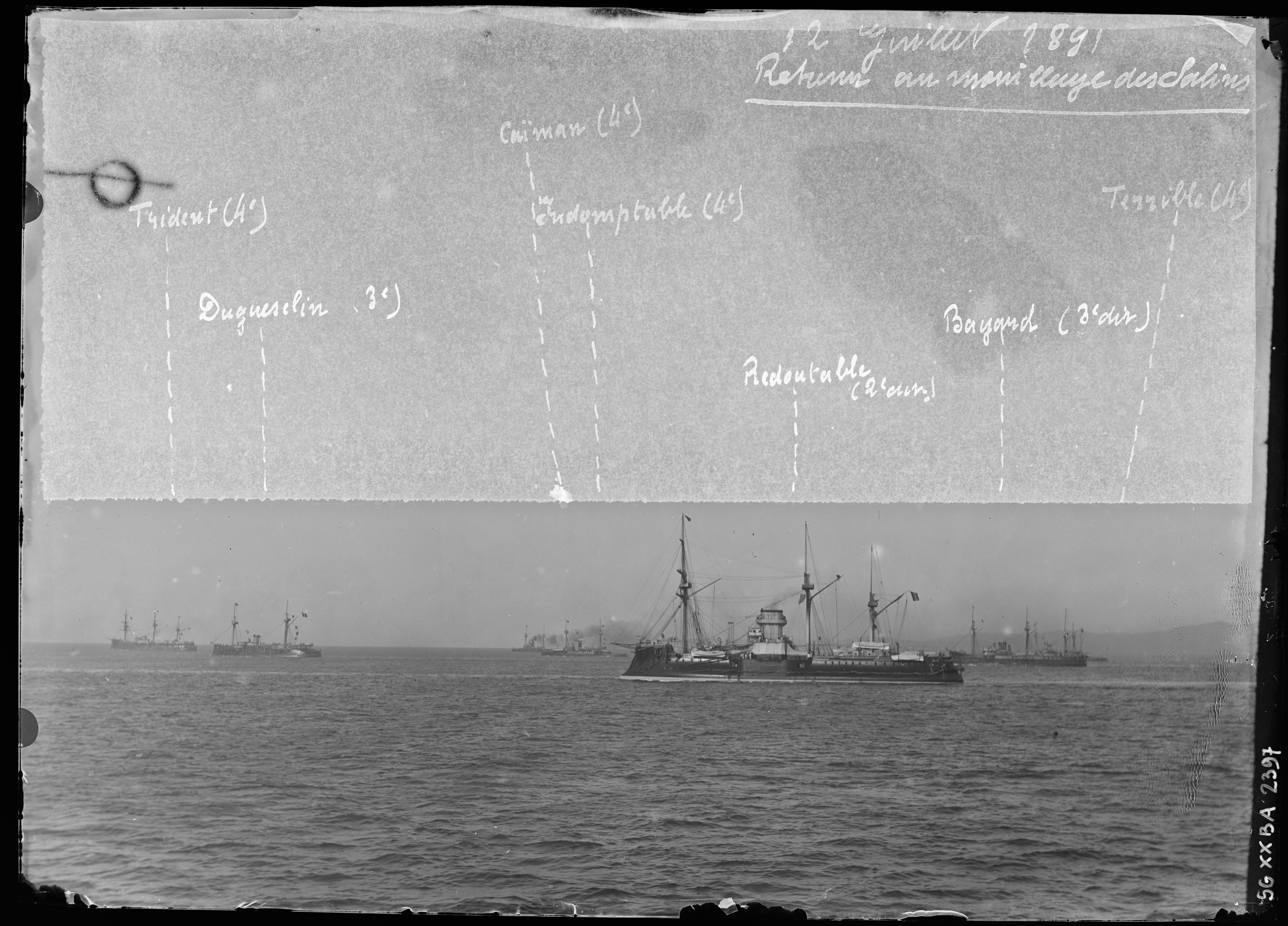
Redoutable (closest to camera) with the rest of the Mediterranean Fleet in 1891

For the fleet maneuvers of 1891, which began on 23 June, Redoutable and Amiral Baudin were transferred to the 2nd Division, 1st Squadron along with the ironclad Hoche. The maneuvers lasted until 11 July. Redoutable served with the Reserve Squadron of the Mediterranean Fleet in 1893; at that time, the squadron also included the ironclads Colbert, Friedland, Richelieu, and Trident and the coastal defense ships Indomptable, Terrible and Caïman. Redoutable was only kept in commission for three months that year. She participated in the fleet maneuvers that year, now as part of the 1st Division in company with Formidable and Courbet. The maneuvers included an initial period of exercises from 1 to 10 July and then larger-scale maneuvers from 17 to 28 July. She was thereafter placed out of service for her first major modernization, which lasted into 1894.

In 1896, the Mediterranean Fleet consisted of Redoutable, the three Marceau-class ironclads, the two Amiral Baudin-class ships, Courbet, Dévastation, and the new pre-dreadnought battleship Brennus. That year's maneuvers lasted from 6 to 30 July and took place off the coast of French Algeria. By 1897, additional pre-dreadnoughts began to enter service, including Charles Martel and Jauréguiberry. They joined Redoutable, the three Marceaus, Brennus, and Amiral Baudin in the Mediterranean Fleet. Redoutable was taken out of service again in 1898 for her second reconstruction. After returning to service in 1899, she was transferred to the Northern Squadron in the English Channel, along with the two Amiral Baudins, Dévastation, Courbet, and Amiral Duperré, since more modern pre-dreadnoughts built in the mid-1890s had entered service by that time. Two of these new battleships—Carnot and Masséna—joined Redoutable in the Northern Squadron in 1900, which at that time also included Formidable, Amiral Duperré, and Amiral Baudin.

Redoutable sailed from Toulon in August 1900, bound for East Asia to serve as the flagship of the French squadron that was organized in response to the Boxer Uprising against foreign nationals in Qing China. She arrived off the Taku Forts on 29 September. By January 1903, Redoutable lay at Saigon, largely inactive. She remained there in reserve that year, along with the old ironclad Vauban, two armored gunboats, and three unarmored gunboats. The ship was in poor condition by that time; the caretaker crews of the reserve ships were frequently significantly reduced by tropical disease, and the contemporary journal of the Royal United Services Institute noted that in the event of an emergency, "mobilisation would be difficult." She was struck from the naval register on 9 March 1910 and sold for scrap on 17 August 1911. She was broken up over the following year in Saigon.
