= Courbet (surname) =

Courbet is a French surname. Notable people with the surname include:

- Amédée Courbet (1828–1885), French admiral
- Félicien Courbet (1888–1967), Belgian water polo player and breaststroke swimmer who competed in the 1908 Summer Olympics
- Gustave Courbet (1819–1877), French painter
- Julien Courbet (born 1965), French journalist

== See also ==
- Curbet
- Courbet (disambiguation)
