= Romance Belgium =

In dialectology, Romance Belgium (Belgique romane in French), also called Wallonia (Wallonie in French), is the part of Belgium where people traditionally speak one of the regional romance languages, all from the Langues d'oïl group. Romance Belgium includes almost all of Dialectal Wallonia where Walloon and French are spoken, a picardic zone corresponding to the major part of the Province of Hainaut, the Pays gaumais (district of Virton) with the Lorrain language and a Champenois zone (Sugny, Bohan, Bagimont, Pussemange, Membre et Cul-des-Sarts).
