= Philip Corbet =

English painter

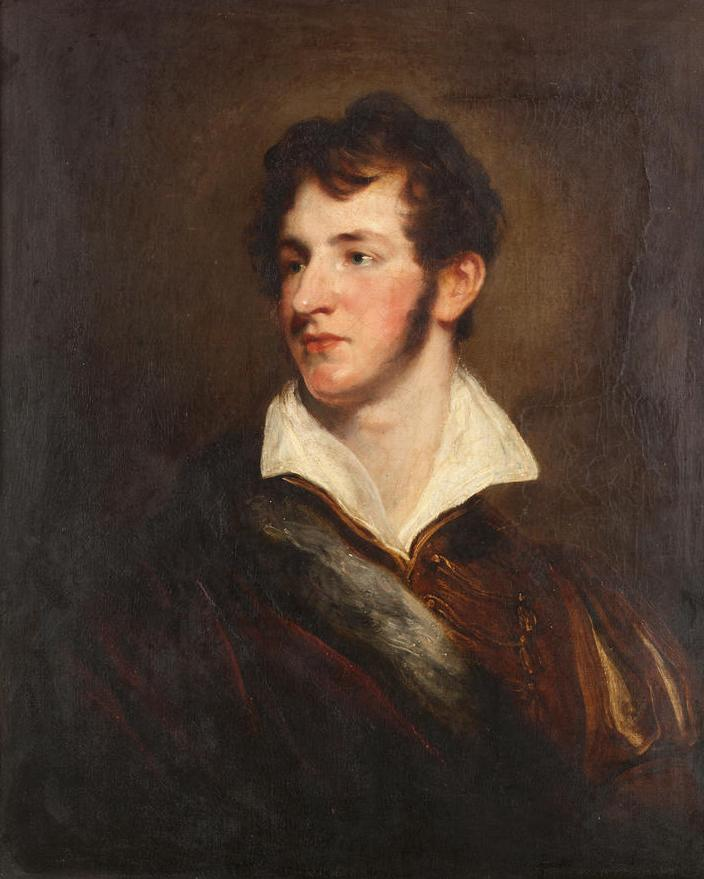
Corbet's portrait painted by Martin Archer Shee in 1823

Philip Corbet (c.1802, Ireland – 18 July 1877, Bitterne, Hampshire), was a 19th-century portrait painter who spent most of his working life in Shrewsbury, Shropshire, England.

== Early life ==
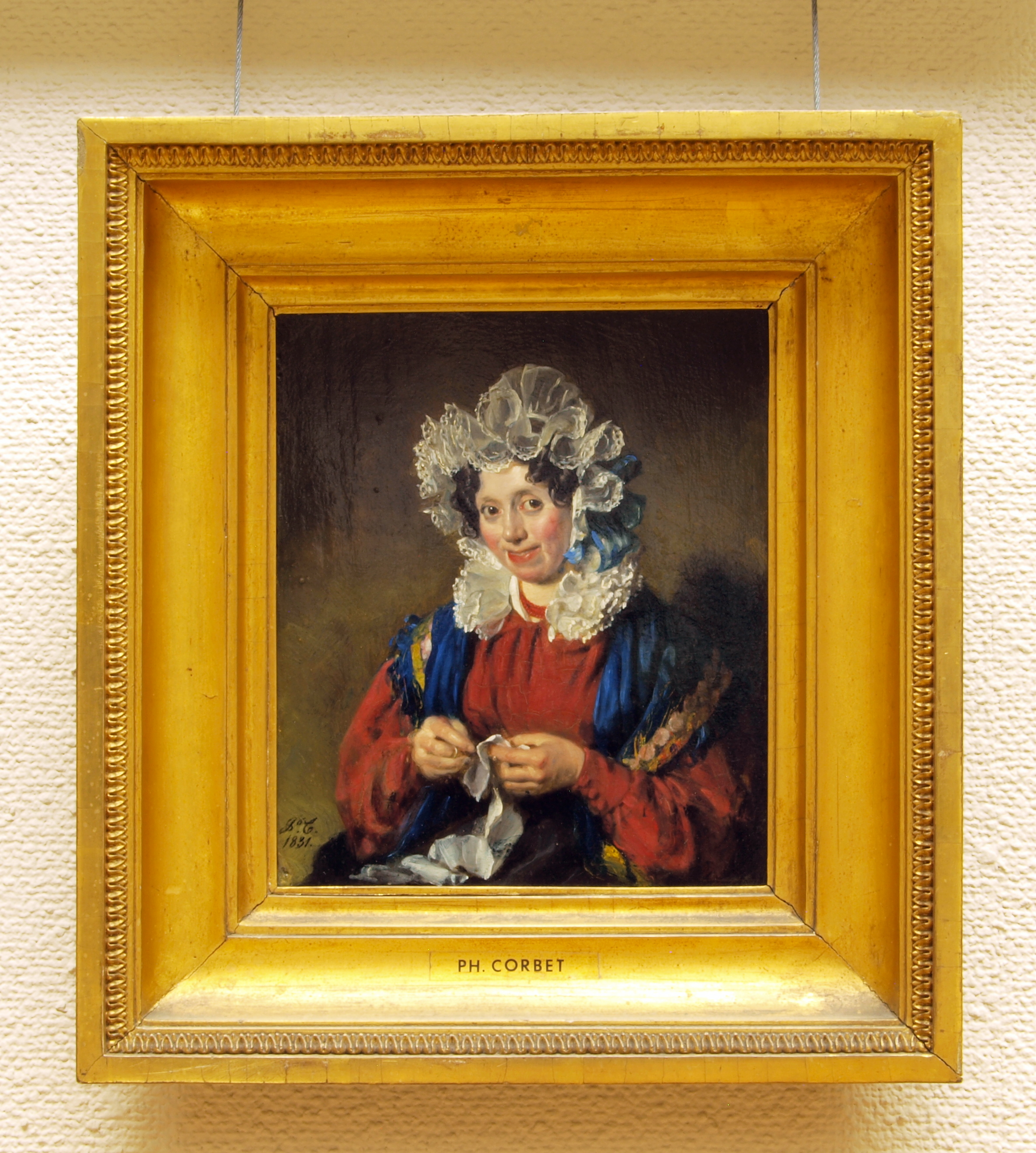
Portrait of a lady, 1831, collection Teylers Museum

Very little is known about Corbet's early life, although it is likely that he was born in County Tipperary, perhaps at his father's home in High Park, Kilbeg, in the North of the county. His exact date of birth is not known, but taking into account his noted age at the time of censuses in 1851, 1861 and 1871 (48 on 30 March 1851, 58 on 7 April 1861 and 68 on 1 April 1871), as well as his age at the time of his death (74 on 18 July 1877), a window of between July 19, 1802 and March 13, 1803 can be discerned. This may be disputed as he is listed in Royal Academy documentation as being aged 19 on 13 March 1821, which would imply a slightly earlier date of birth.

Philip's daughter Edith would later write that her father had been ‘intended for the Church‘ but that he was 'so passionately fond of painting that he at last induced his parents to allow him to follow the great mists of his heart, and become a painter’.

== Student at the Royal Academy ==
After a period as a student in the Dublin Society Drawing Schools, where he is noted within the School of Landscape and Ornament Drawing in 1819, he left Ireland for London in 1821 to enrol as a student in the Royal Academy. At this time the Academy was under the presidency of Thomas Lawrence. Henry Fuseli, J. M. W. Turner and Martin Archer Shee were all professors at this time, with the lattermost of these becoming a close acquaintance of Corbet, painting his portrait in 1823.

Corbet won a number of awards during his time as a student: a silver medal in 1822 for a "copy in oil of an historical figure", and in 1823 won a large silver medal for "a drawing from a statue" whilst also being awarded a premium for a copy in oil of a bust of Homer.

In 1822, he was living at the Charing Cross end of the Strand, at number 482, and would later reside on Everett Street, Russel Square, where Algernon Graves notes him as having still been in 1825. And yet, it is likely that by this time he had already settled in Shrewsbury, as his name appears in a list of members of the local Freemasons lodge in 1825. During his time in London, he had become a friend of the Salopian sculptor Thomas Carline, whose name appears beside his on both the R.A. enrollment records and the subsequent list of Freemasons. This friendship would have allowed Corbet immediate networking upon moving to Shrewsbury and may have been part of the motivation behind his decision to settle there. Amongst his earliest known paintings are portraits of each of Thomas' parents, whilst he would later paint their three sons and their daughter, Jane, who he would later wed in 1832.

== Shrewsbury ==
He very quickly managed to obtain commissions from much of the societal elites in the area, with Thomas Kenyon of Pradoe Hall, near Oswestry, one notable patron during this early period of his career. Amongst others were portraits of Dr. William Clement, the Three Burton Brothers and a joint portrait of Hugh Owen and John Brickdale Blakeway, whose History of Shrewsbury was hugely successful in the town at the time. All three of these paintings are held in the collection of Shrewsbury Museum and Art Gallery, and reflect his highly finished, refined, style. Similarities between his work and that of the seventeenth-century Dutch painters like Gerard ter Borch and Gerard Dou are clear during this period.

== Trip to The Netherlands ==
Corbet's interest in Dutch art later manifesting itself in his travelling to The Netherlands in 1829 or 1830, a trip he undertook with Thomas Carline. Time spent with some of his Dutch contemporaries took him to Dordrecht, where he painted Arie Johannes Lamme, and to The Hague, where he painted Henrietta Christina Temminck. Whilst in The Hague, he also spent time with Hendrik Hentzepeter, a guard and housekeeper for the Royal Museums who lived for a time in the basement of the Mauritshuis and would give tours to visitors. Corbet's portraits of Hendrik and his wife Wendelina, today held in the collection of the Teylers Museum, are amongst his finest portraits.

Corbet would return to Shrewsbury with copies of paintings by a number of Dutch Old Masters, with five of these copies later exhibited in Shrewsbury in an exhibition in 1958, when they were listed, with some slight titular alterations, as A Copy of Van Ostade’s Portrait of Paulus Potter, Lady in White Satin (after Gerard ter Borch), Dutch Interior (after Gerard Dou), Dutch Interior (after Pieter de Hooch) and Presentation of Christ in the Temple (after Rembrandt).

== Return to Shrewsbury ==
Upon returning from the Netherlands, he married Jane Carline, and his good friend Thomas became his brother-in-law. Jane and Philip would go on have ten children, which they raised in the Judge's Lodgings, in Shrewsbury's Belmont area, accommodation acquired with the help of his long-time patron Thomas Kenyon. He was able set up a studio in the attic here and proceeded to have a productive career as a portraitist until the 1850s. In the documentation concerning his eventual eviction from the property, it is suggested by Philip's son Rowland that, by 1856, his sight was failing him and that he was unable to practise painting in the manner he previously had. Within these letters, it is also suggested that he had looked to transition to a career as a daguerreotype portraitist, perhaps in an attempt to combat his declining sight.

Following three portraits painted in 1856, no other paintings by Corbet are documented, but he would live for another 21 years.

== Later Years ==
By 1861, he had left Shrewsbury, census data noting him as a resident of St Helier on Jersey, in which he is listed not as a painter but as a ‘Gentleman’ and a ‘Proprietor of Ireland’. Two of his children, Cyril and Rowland, had pursued careers in the Navy, so it is likely that he and Jane moved south to be closer to them. He remained in Jersey for much of the rest of his life and is noted as still being in St. Hellier in the 1871 census, although this time as a 'Retired Painter'. Philip and Jane later moved to Bitterne, near Southampton, where Philip died in 1877 at the age of 74.
