= French cruiser Dubourdieu =

French unprotected cruiser

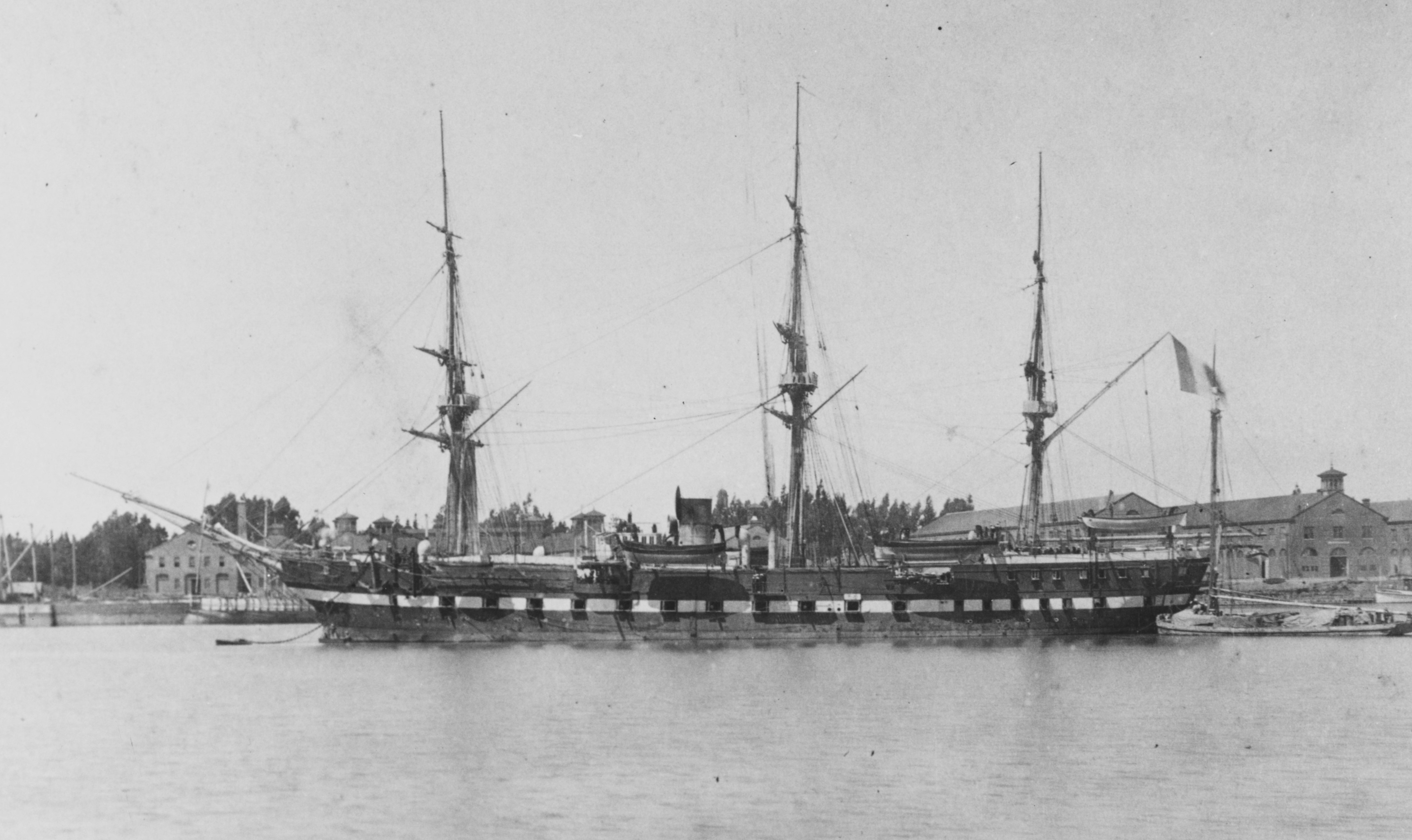
- Dubourdieu off Mare Island around 1890

Class overview
- Preceded by: Aréthuse
- Succeeded by: Milan

History

France
- Name: Dubordieu
- Builder: Arsenal de Cherbourg
- Laid down: 6 September 1880
- Launched: 6 December 1884
- Completed: December 1887
- Commissioned: 15 June 1886
- Out of service: 9 May 1899
- Stricken: 1 December 1899
- Fate: Broken up, 1900

General characteristics
- Type: Unprotected cruiser
- Displacement: 3,354.7 t (3,301.7 long tons) normal
- Length: 77.3 m (253 ft 7 in) lpp
- Beam: 14.28 m (46 ft 10 in)
- Draft: 6.2 m (20 ft 4 in)
- Installed power: 12 × fire-tube boilers; 3,150 ihp (2,350 kW)
- Propulsion: 1 × compound steam engine; 1 × screw propeller
- Sail plan: Full ship rig
- Speed: 13.9 knots (25.7 km/h; 16.0 mph)
- Complement: 412
- Armament: 4 × 164.7 mm (6.48 in) guns; 12 × 138.6 mm (5.46 in) guns; 1 × 47 mm (1.9 in) 3-pounder Hotchkiss revolver cannon; 10 × 37 mm (1 in) 1-pounder Hotchkiss revolver cannon; 2 × 350 mm (13.8 in) torpedo tubes

Dubordieu' was an unprotected cruiser built for the French Navy in the early 1880s. Intended to serve as a long-range commerce raider, the ship was fitted with a sailing rig to supplement its steam engine on long voyages, and she carried an armament of four 165 mm (6.5 in) and twelve 140 mm (5.5 in) guns. She was among the final French unprotected cruisers, thereafter being replaced by more durable protected cruisers. The French Navy was not satisfied with the vessel, owing to her obsolescent design, since she too weak to defeat the more powerful protected cruisers and was too slow to escape from them.

The ship served as the flagship of the Pacific station after entering service in 1889, but was forced to return home the following year to correct defects in her propulsion system. Dubourdieu returned to the Pacific later in 1890 and served there for the next several years. She was recalled home by 1895, and the next year she became the flagship of the North Atlantic station, a role she filled through 1899. The ship was placed in reserve in May that year, before being converted into a training ship; she was quickly sold to ship breakers in 1900.

== Design ==
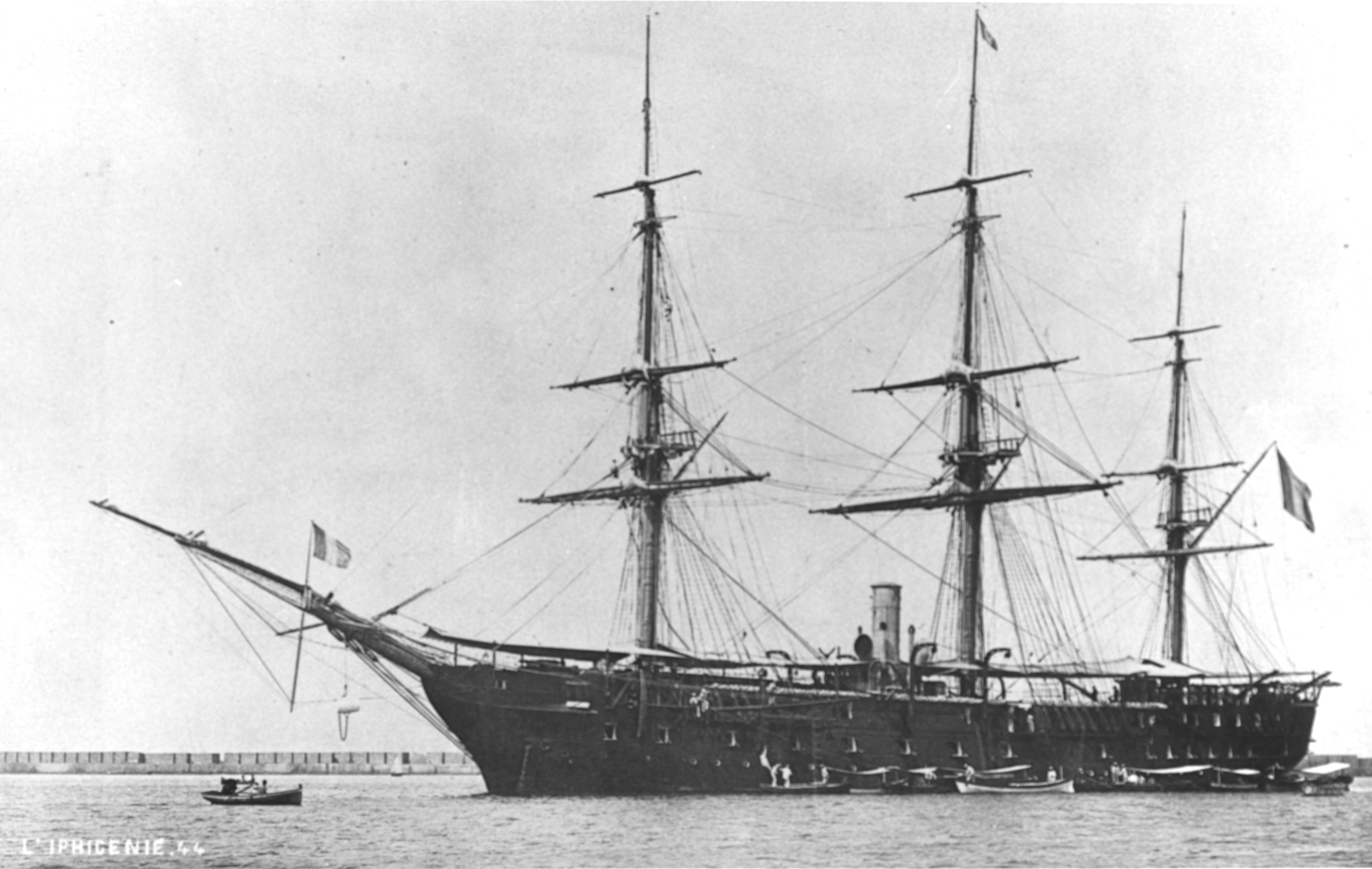
Iphigénie, which provided the basis for Dubourdieu

In the late 1870s, the French Navy had embarked on a program of cruiser construction based on a strategy aimed at attacking British merchant shipping in the event of war. The design for Dubourdieu traces its origin to discussions over the preceding French cruiser, Aréthuse in February 1878. The Minister of the Navy, Louis Pierre Alexis Pothuau, asked the Conseil des Travaux (Council of Works) for recommendations on what types of cruisers should be built in the future. He was particularly concerned with the expense of earlier, large cruisers like Tourville, the cost of which would likely preclude building them in large numbers. The Conseil made their report on 28 March, and recommended ships of around 3,000 to 3,200 tonnes (3,000 to 3,100 long tons), good freeboard, a speed of 16 knots (30 km/h; 18 mph), and a cruising radius of 4,000 nautical miles (7,400 km; 4,600 mi). Firepower would be considerable, consisting of either four 194 mm (7.6 in) or six 164.7 mm (6.48 in) guns and at least twelve 138.6 mm (5.46 in) guns. As the French Navy only had two vessels that met the recommended criteria, the Conseil argued that more should be built. (Note: A further three vessels—Iphigénie, Naïade, and Aréthuse—were under construction.)

During discussions for the upcoming 1879 construction program, the Conseil d'Amirauté (Admiralty Council) noted that the number of large cruisers, including the three Arethusé-type ships under construction, were insufficient to the fleet's needs. In addition, the Arethusé type was insufficiently armed to be able to engage foreign counterparts like the British Shah or the German Leipzig. The Admiralty Council called for four new cruisers suited to the task be built. The naval constructor Pierre Gaston Hermann Valin, who had designed the cruiser Iphigénie, prepared an improved version of that ship to meet the Navy's requirements. He lengthened the hull, which created room for a more powerful propulsion system and additional guns. In January 1880, two ships of the design were allocated to the 1881 construction program; the first, to become Dubourdieu, and the second, was to be named Capitaine Lucas. The following year, a third vessel of the class was added to the budget, though this vessel was never named.

During construction, Louis-Émile Bertin submitted a proposal for a new steel-hulled cruiser with an armor deck, a type that would become known as the protected cruiser. The Conseil des Traveaux rejected his proposal on 4 August 1881, but the naval minister, Georges Charles Cloué, overruled their decision shortly thereafter. He ordered the second and third Dubourdieu-class cruisers to be suspended and Bertin's ship to be built in their place. Dubourdieu and the three vessels of the Arethusé type were the final generation of unprotected cruisers built in France, that type thereafter being replaced by protected cruisers in the early 1880s, beginning with Bertin's ship, which became Sfax.

In addition to being the last unprotected cruiser of the French fleet, Dubourdieu was to be the last wooden-hulled cruiser to be built in France. France was among the last countries to build wooden-hulled cruisers, along with the United States; the French Navy preferred the use of wood, both because it was cheaper than steel, and it also allowed steel production to be concentrated on the ironclad warships then being built. The ship was poorly regarded as a result of her dated design; she was significantly weaker than the new protected cruisers that began to enter service in foreign navies by the time she was completed. She was also too slow to escape more powerful vessels. Admiral Jules François Émile Krantz is believed to have remarked that Dubourdieu was "nothing more than nice accommodations."

=== Characteristics ===
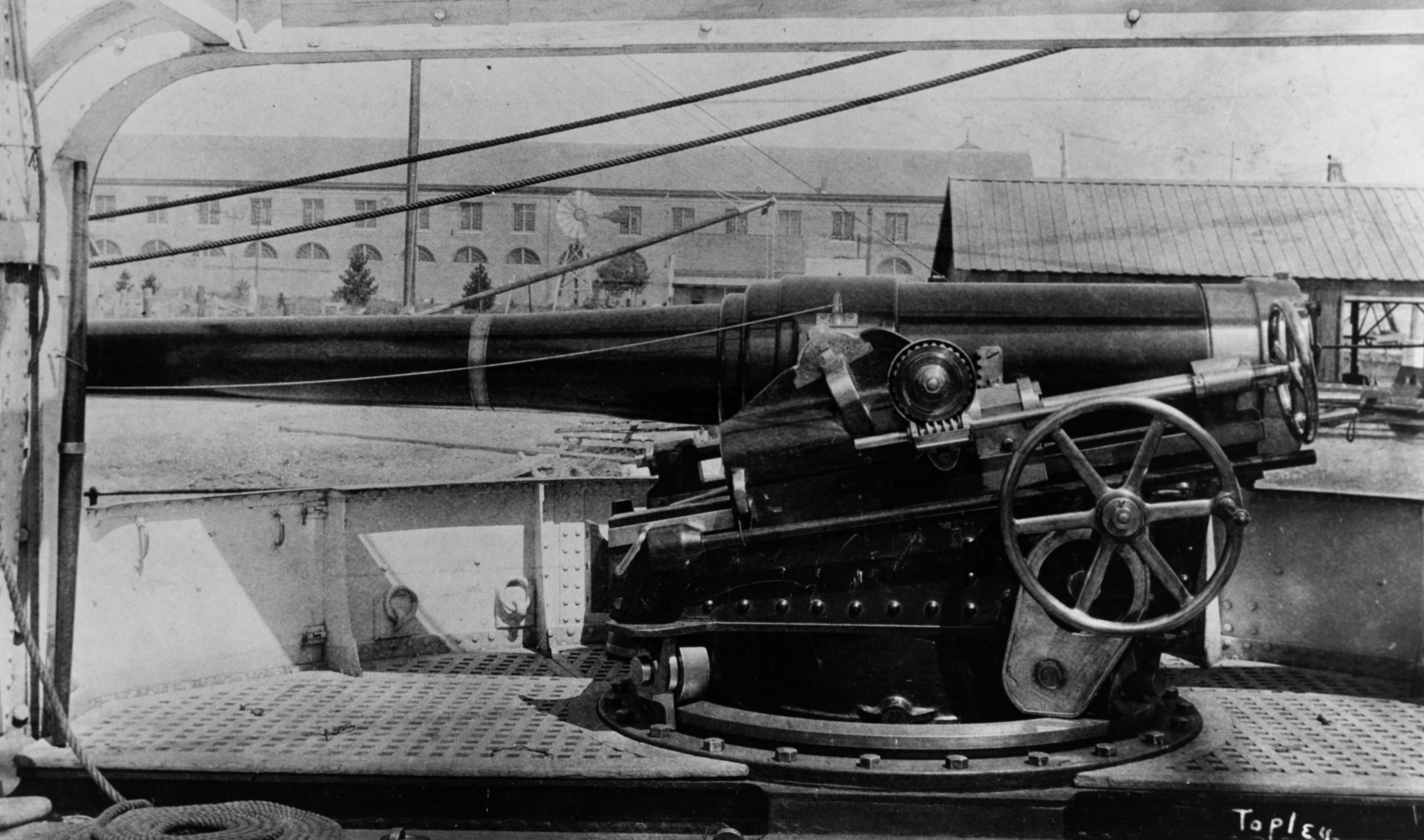
One of Dubourdieu's main guns

Dubourdieu was 73.97 m (242 ft 8 in) long at the waterline and 77.3 m (253 ft 7 in) long between perpendiculars, with a beam of 14.28 m (46 ft 10 in) and an average draft of 6.2 m (20 ft 4 in). Aft, her draft increased to 6.97 m (22 ft 10 in). She displaced 3,354.7 t (3,301.7 long tons) normally. Her hull was constructed with wood; she had a clipper bow and an overhanging stern. The ship had no armor protection. Her crew consisted of 422 officers and enlisted men.

The ship was propelled by a single horizontal, 3-cylinder compound steam engine that drove a screw propeller. Steam was provided by twelve coal-burning fire-tube boilers that were ducted into a single funnel located amidships. Coal storage amounted to 400 t (390 long tons). The power plant was rated to produce 3,150 indicated horsepower (2,350 kW) for a top speed of 14 knots (26 km/h; 16 mph), but on speed trials, she reached only 13.91 knots (25.76 km/h; 16.01 mph). At a cruising speed of 10 knots (19 km/h; 12 mph), Dubourdieu could steam for 4,780 nautical miles (8,850 km; 5,500 mi). The ship's engines proved to be troublesome in service, a common problem with French cruisers of the period. To supplement her steam engines, she was fitted with a three-masted full ship rig.

The ship was armed with a main battery of four 164.7 mm (6.48 in) M1881 28-caliber guns that were placed in sponsons on the upper deck, two per side. These were supported by a secondary battery of twelve 138.6 mm (5.46 in) M1881 30-caliber guns, ten of which were placed in a central gun battery on the main deck. The remaining two 138.6 mm guns were located aft. For close-range defense against torpedo boats, she carried a tertiary battery of a single 47 mm (1.9 in) gun and ten 37 mm (1 in) Hotchkiss revolver cannon. Dubourdieu was also fitted with two 350 mm (13.8 in) torpedo tubes in above-water mounts, one on each broadside. The ship carried a pair of 65 mm (2.6 in) field guns that could be sent ashore with a landing party.

== Service history ==
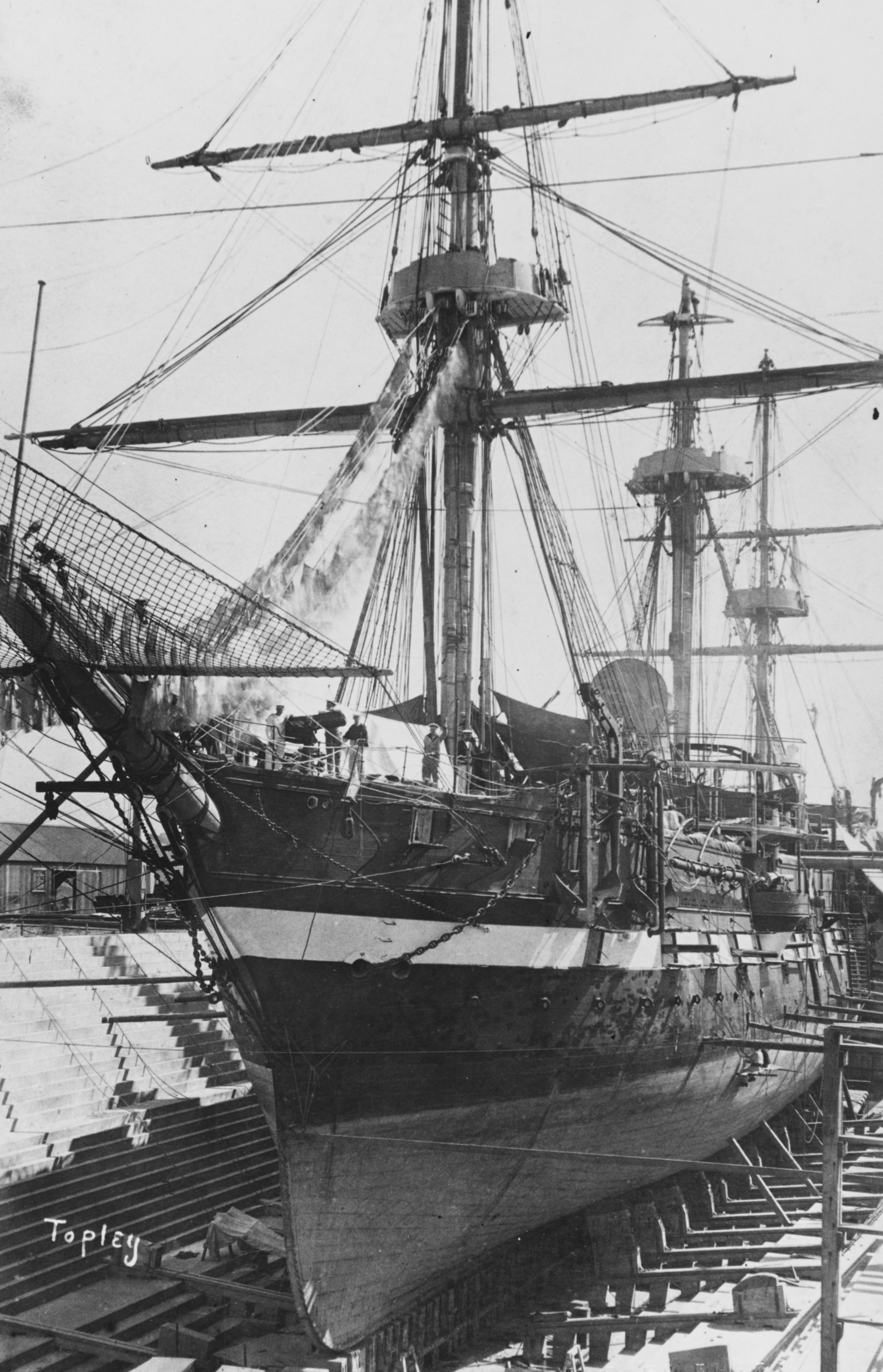
Dubourdieu in dry-dock at the Mare Island Naval Shipyard in California around 1890

Dubourdieu was built at the Arsenal de Cherbourg; she was ordered on 24 December 1879 and her keel was laid down on 6 September 1880. She was launched on 6 December 1884. Delays with the design and manufacturing of the steam engines slowed work on the ship, and she was finally completed in 1886, being commissioned for sea trials on 15 June. After conducting her full-power trials on 9 September, she was placed in reserve. Further trials were carried out, beginning on 6 June 1887, and after defects were discovered during a test run on 16 July, she was placed in the 3rd category of reserve for alterations on 10 August. She carried out further trials and was moved to the 2nd category of reserve on 22 December, at which point the ship was pronounced complete. At some point during the trials period, Dubourdieu received additional alterations, including the installation of admiral's quarters to allow the vessel to serve as a flagship.

On 18 November 1889, Dubourdieu was recommissioned to deploy to the Pacific station, replacing the cruiser Duquesne as the flagship there. The ship's arrival was delayed when engine damage forced her to return to Cherbourg for repairs on 15 February 1890. She departed again on 10 April. The ship sailed south through the Atlantic, rounded Cape Horn, and made calls in a series of ports along the way, including in Chile, Peru, and the Hawaiian Kingdom, before reaching Tahiti in French Polynesia. After arriving in the Pacific, she operated with the unprotected cruisers Volta and Champlain. From 30 June to 23 July 1891, the ship was dry docked at the Mare Island Naval Shipyard for repairs to her stern. During the early 1890s, the ships were primarily responsible for patrolling the French colonies in the Pacific. She remained in the area into 1893; by that time, the unit also consisted of the unprotected cruisers Duguay-Trouin and Duchaffault. Later that year, Dubourdieu was recalled to France, where she was placed in reserve through 1895.

After recommissioning in 1896, Dubourdieu was assigned to the North American station to serve as its flagship, along with the unprotected cruiser Roland. The following year, Roland was replaced by the unprotected cruiser Rigault de Genouilly, with Dubourdieu still the flagship. In May that year, Dubourdieu steamed to Cherbourg to undergo an overhaul and receive a new crew before resuming her role as the station flagship.

She remained on the station into 1899, by which time she had been joined by the protected cruiser Sfax. By that time, Dubourdieu flew the flag of Rear Admiral Escande. She arrived in Brest on 16 April, where Escande hauled down his flag. Four days later, the ship moved to Lorient, where she was later paid off into reserve on 9 May. She was struck from the naval register on 1 December that year and was briefly used as a stationary training ship. Dubourdieu was soon sold for scrap on 19 May 1900 to M. Degoul at Lorient and broken up.
