= Iphigenia (disambiguation) =

Iphigenia is a figure in Greek mythology.

Iphigenia may also refer to:

== Arts and entertainment ==
- Iphigenia (film), 1977 film in Greek
- Iphigenia (opera), 2021, by Wayne Shorter

== People ==
- Iphigenia of Abyssinia (or Ethiopia), Western folk saint
- Iphigenia Efunjoke Coker (1924–2019), Nigerian educator
- Iphigenia Photaki (1921–1983), Greek chemist

== Science ==
- Iphigenia (bivalve), an animal
- Iphigenia (plant), a flower
- 112 Iphigenia, an asteroid

== Ships ==
- HMS Iphigenia, four British warships

== See also ==
- Ifigenia (disambiguation)
- Iphigénie (disambiguation)
- Euphegenia Doubtfire, in 1993 American comedy film Mrs. Doubtfire
