= Ifigenia =

Ifigenia may refer to:

== Books and film ==
- Ifigenia (novel), 1924 novel by Teresa de la Parra
- Ifigenia, 1950 novel Gonzalo Torrente Ballester
- Ifigenia (1986 film), directed by Iván Feo

== Music ==
- Ifigenia (Pizzetti), 1950 opera by Ildebrando Pizzetti
- Ifigenia in Aulide (disambiguation)
- Ifigenia in Tauride (disambiguation)

== People ==
- Ifigenia Martínez y Hernández (1925–2024), Mexican economist, diplomat, and politician

== See also ==
- Iphigenia (disambiguation)
- Ifigeneia
