= Ifigeneia =

Ifigeneia (Greek: Ιφιγένεια) is a feminine given name of Greek origin. Notable people with the name include:

- Ifigeneia Asteriadi (1967–2024), Greek actress
- Ifigeneia Georgantzi (born 2000), Greek footballer
- Ifigeneia Giannopoulou (1964–2004), Greek songwriter

== See also ==
- Ifigenia (disambiguation)
- Iphigenia (disambiguation)
