= French cruiser Aréthuse =

French unprotected cruiser

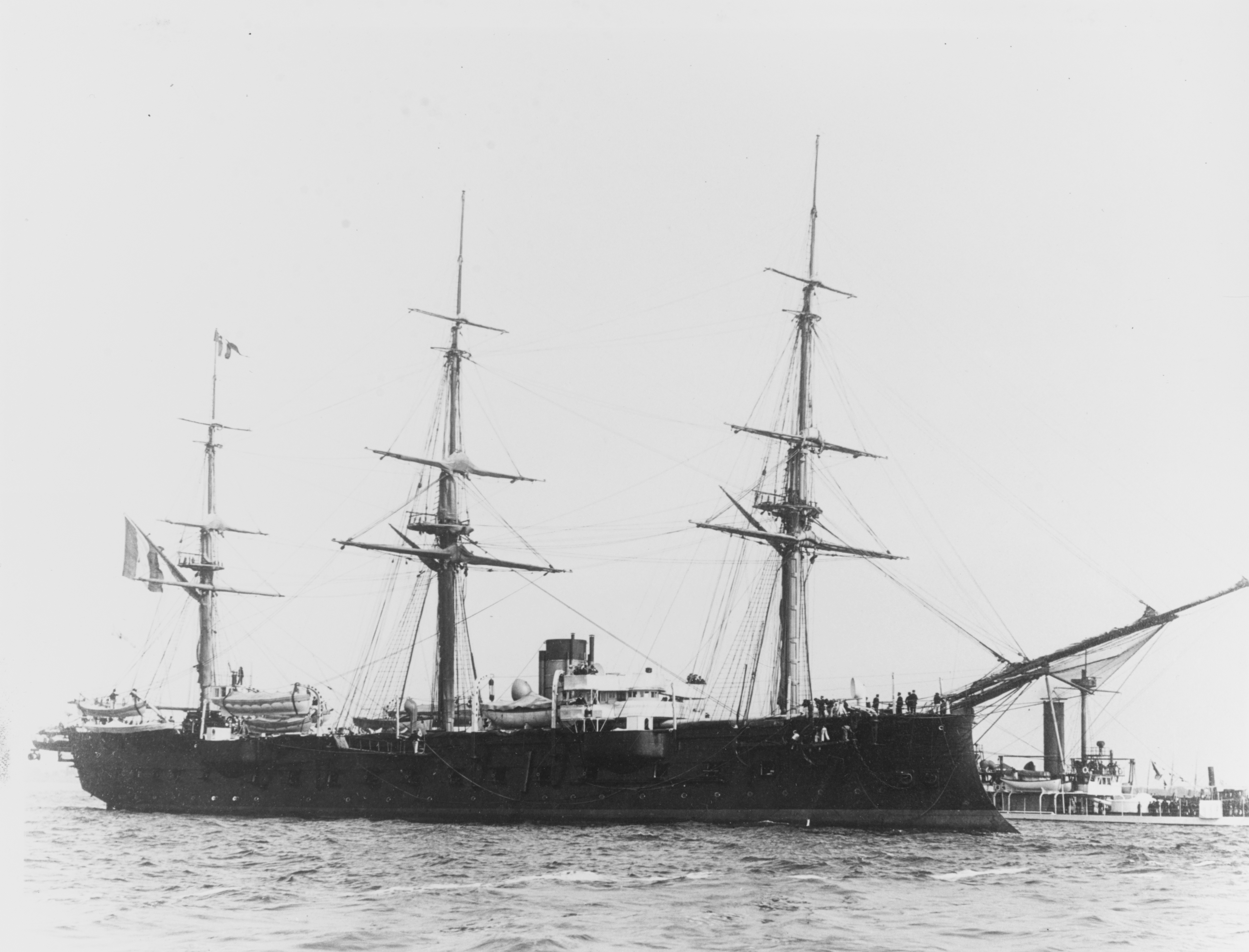
- Aréthuse at the World's Columbian Exposition naval review in April 1893

Class overview
- Preceded by: Naïade
- Succeeded by: Dubourdieu

History

France
- Name: Aréthuse
- Builder: Arsenal de Toulon
- Laid down: 11 February 1879
- Launched: 14 September 1882
- Commissioned: 1 January 1884
- Stricken: 1 December 1899
- Fate: Broken up, 1904

General characteristics
- Type: Unprotected cruiser
- Displacement: 3,587 t (3,530 long tons)
- Length: 84 m (275 ft 7 in) lpp
- Beam: 13.61 m (44 ft 8 in)
- Draft: 6.13 m (20 ft 1 in) (avg)
- Installed power: 8 × fire-tube boilers; 3,200 indicated horsepower (2,400 kW)
- Propulsion: 1 × compound steam engine; 1 × screw propeller
- Sail plan: Full ship rig
- Speed: 15.5 knots (28.7 km/h; 17.8 mph)
- Complement: 467
- Armament: 4 × 164.7 mm (6.48 in) guns; 22 × 138.6 mm (5.46 in) guns; 8 × 37 mm (1.5 in) Hotchkiss revolver cannon

Aréthuse was an unprotected cruiser built for the French Navy. The ship was laid down in 1879 and completed in 1885. Intended to serve as a long-range commerce raider, the ship was fitted with a sailing rig to supplement its steam engine on long voyages, and she carried an armament of four 165 mm (6.5 in) and twenty-two 140 mm (5.5 in) guns. She was among the final French unprotected cruisers, thereafter being replaced by more durable protected cruisers.

The ship served with the main fleet in the Mediterranean Sea in 1886 before being assigned to patrol duty with the South Atlantic Squadron, serving as the unit's flagship. Aréthuse had been transferred to the North Atlantic Squadron by 1890, and was extensively modernized in 1891–1892. Another stint with the North Atlantic Squadron followed from 1893 to 1895, and in 1899, she was reduced to a hulk. Aréthuse was briefly used as the headquarters for the coastal defense unit based in Landévennec, but was broken up in 1901.

== Design ==
In 1878, the French Navy embarked on a program of cruiser construction authorized by the Conseil des Travaux (Council of Works) for a strategy aimed at attacking British merchant shipping in the event of war. The program called for ships of around 3,000 long tons (3,048 t) with a speed of 16 knots (30 km/h; 18 mph). Four vessels were ordered, including Aréthuse; the vessels were dated designs more similar to the first screw frigates that had been built in the 1850s than the latest protected cruisers being designed abroad. Aréthuse and the other three vessels were the final generation of unprotected cruisers built in France, that type thereafter being replaced by protected cruisers beginning with Sfax in the early 1880s.

The design for Aréthuse was prepared by the naval constructor Arthur Bienaymé, which he submitted to the Minister of the Navy, Louis Pierre Alexis Pothuau. Bienaymé designed a ship similar in size to the earlier cruiser Duguay-Trouin. Pothuau forward it to the Conseil des Travaux on 8 February 1878, which during a meeting on 26 March, made several recommendations for improvements. These primarily concerned the arrangement of the armament, which Bienaymé had placed on the upper deck, but the Conseil wanted to be a deck lower so that it would be covered. On 6 April 1878, Pothuau issued a request to the various French shipyards for proposals for a pair of new cruisers similar to what the Conseil had asked Bienaymé to revise about his design. Pothuau wanted a ship not more than 83 m (272 ft 4 in) in length, with a top speed of 16 knots (30 km/h; 18 mph), and an armament of four 194 mm (7.6 in) or six 164.7 mm (6.5 in) guns and twelve 138.6 mm (5.5 in) guns. Pothuau had received a number of submissions by July, and he forwarded six of them, including Bienaymé's, to the Conseil for further evaluation. They selected two on 13 August, and Bienaymé's revised proposal became Aréthuse.

Aréthuse's design was revised during construction in 1882; the naval minister at that time, Admiral Bernard Jauréguiberry, decided that the 194 mm guns were too heavy, so he ordered they be replaced with 164.7 mm guns. The reduction in firepower was compensated by an increase in the number of 138.6 mm guns to twenty two. The changes increased the crew significantly and reduced the room available for accommodation and storage spaces. The design was nevertheless approved as revised on 27 July 1883. Though the ship was originally intended to carry four torpedo tubes, these were never installed.

=== Characteristics ===
Aréthuse was 83 m (272 ft 4 in) long at the waterline and 84 m (275 ft 7 in) long between perpendiculars, with a beam of 13.61 m (44 ft 8 in) and an average draft of 6.13 m (20 ft 1 in). After, her draft increased to 8.88 m (29 ft 2 in). She displaced 3,587 t (3,530 long tons). Her hull was constructed with wood; she had a ram bow and an overhanging stern. She had a raised forecastle and sterncastle. The ship had no armor protection. Her crew varied over the course of her career, ranging from 467 to 474 officers and enlisted men.

The ship was propelled by a single horizontal, 3-cylinder compound steam engine that drove a screw propeller. Steam was provided by eight coal-burning fire-tube boilers that were ducted into a single funnel located amidships. Coal storage amounted to 477.8 t (470.3 long tons). The power plant was designed to produce 3,360 indicated horsepower (2,510 kW), but on speed trials, her propulsion system reached 4,175 ihp (3,113 kW), for a top speed of 15.57 knots (28.84 km/h; 17.92 mph). At a cruising speed of 10 knots (19 km/h; 12 mph), she could steam for 5,100 nautical miles (9,400 km; 5,900 mi). To supplement her steam engines, she was fitted with a three-masted full ship rig.

The ship was armed with a main battery of four 164.7 mm M1881 28-caliber guns that were placed in sponsons on the upper deck, two per side. These were supported by a secondary battery of twenty-two 138.6 mm M1881 30-caliber guns, twenty of which were placed in a central gun battery on the main deck, ten per broadside. The remaining two guns were on the fore- and sterncastle for use as chase guns. For close-range defense against torpedo boats, she carried a tertiary battery of eight 37 mm (1.5 in) 1-pounder Hotchkiss revolver cannon in single pivot mounts. The ship also carried a pair of 65 mm (2.6 in) field guns that could be sent ashore with a landing party.

=== Modifications ===
Aréthuse underwent a series of modifications over the course of her career. In 1890, the fore- and sterncastle 138.6 mm guns were removed. The following year, the aft-most four 138.6 mm guns were removed from the battery, and the space they had occupied was converted into an officer's wardroom. In 1891–1892, the ship's propulsion system was improved significantly, receiving new boilers and an overhaul of her engine. The improved propulsion system allowed the ship to reach a speed of 17 knots (31 km/h; 20 mph) from 4,000 indicated horsepower (3,000 kW) during speed tests. During this period, the light armament was expanded with four 47 mm (1.9 in) 40-cal. M1885 Hotchkiss quick-firing guns.

== Service history ==
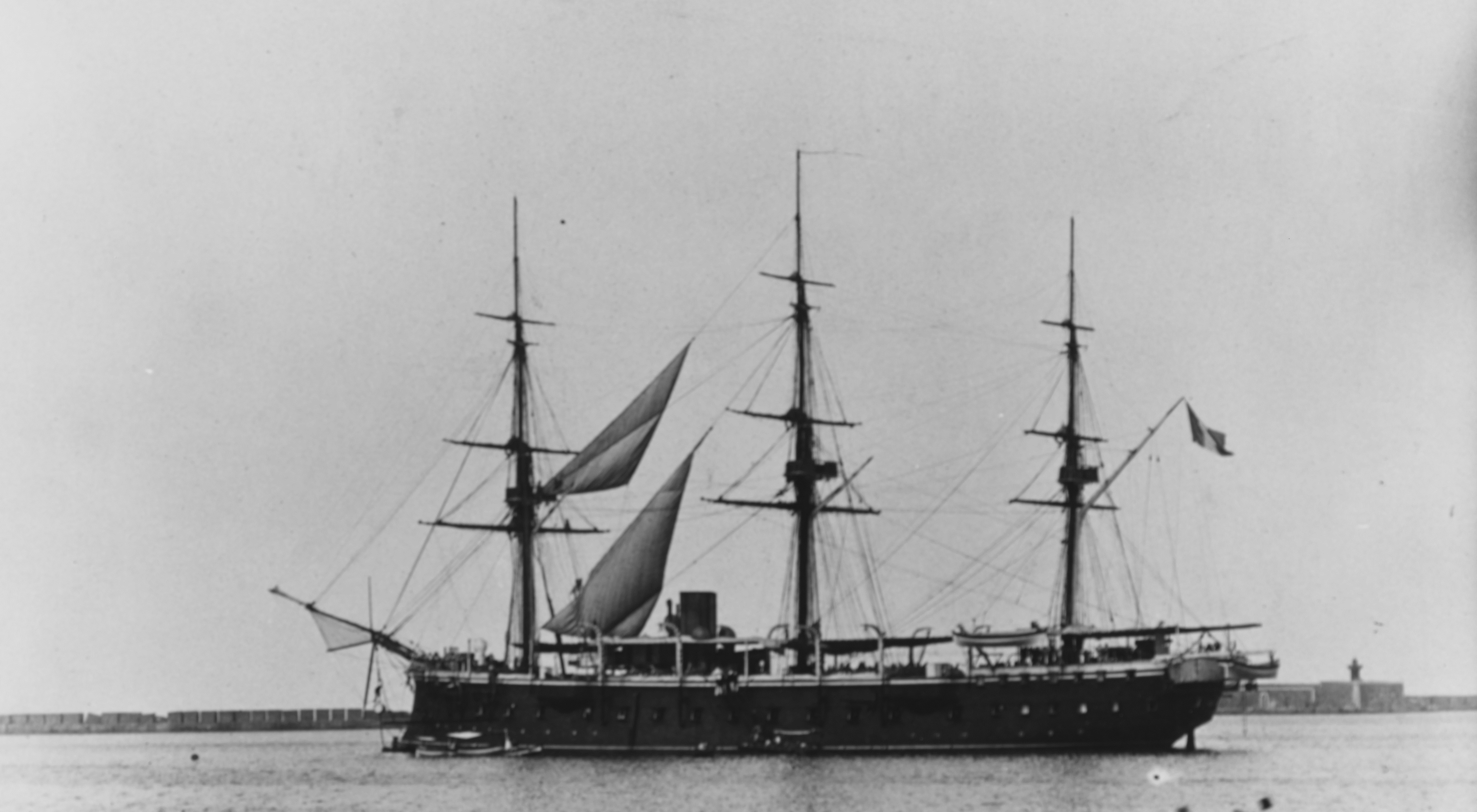
Aréthuse, date and location unknown

Aréthuse was laid down at the Arsenal de Toulon on 11 February 1879 and was launched on 14 September 1882. She was commissioned to begin sea trials on 1 January 1884, which were completed by 5 May 1885, when she was placed in full commission. She was immediately sent on a diplomatic mission to Morocco, but after returning to France, was placed in reserve temporarily.

She remained in reserve into 1886, but later that year, Aréthuse was activated to take part in the annual large-scale fleet maneuvers with the Mediterranean Squadron that year, which were held off Toulon from 10 to 17 May. The exercises were used to test the effectiveness of torpedo boats in defending the coastline from a squadron of ironclads, whether cruisers and torpedo boats could break through a blockade of ironclads, and whether a flotilla of torpedo boats could intercept ironclads at sea. Aréthuse was assigned to the defending squadron, along with the coastal defense ship Fulminant, the cruisers Dupetit-Thouars and Desaix, and twenty torpedo boats. The exercises demonstrated the limited usefulness of the small French torpedo boats, and late in the maneuvers, Aréthuse was judged to have been "hit" by a torpedo from a friendly torpedo boat.

In September 1886, Aréthuse was assigned to the West Africa station, departing from Toulon on 7 September. In 1887, Aréthuse was transferred to the South Atlantic Squadron, where she served as its flagship. In March 1888, the naval minister Jules François Émile Krantz ordered the North Atlantic and South Atlantic divisions to be consolidated into the Atlantic Division, with Aréthuse as the divisional flagship. The new unit also included the cruiser Ducouëdic, the sloops Bisson and Dumont-d'Urville, and the gunboat Étoile. In 1890, the ship had been assigned to the North Atlantic Squadron, along with the unprotected cruisers Roland, Kerguélen, and Sané and the sloop Bisson.

Aréthuse was decommissioned to be modernized in 1891 and conducted sea trials in January 1892. The following year, she returned to the North Atlantic squadron, which included the unprotected cruisers Magon and Segond and the aviso Hussard. During that period, she served as the squadron flagship, and she took part in the international Columbian Naval Review held off New York on 27 April 1893. She was joined by the protected cruiser Jean Bart and Hussard for the ceremonies. She remained assigned to the station in 1894, and in September, she was sent to Rio de Janeiro, Brazil, in response to the outbreak of the Revolta da Armada (Revolt of the Fleet). Aréthuse was joined by several British, German, and Italian vessels, all of which were sent to protect European interests in the area. The French, British, German, and Italian commanders, having threatened to bombard the city, negotiated with the Brazilian naval commander and President Floriano Peixoto and secured an arrangement where neither side would fire on the other without having been shot at first.

Aréthuse was recalled home by 1895. The ship was struck from the naval register on 1 December 1899, was renamed Sémiramis, and was converted into a hulk armed with just four 37 mm guns in 1899. She was used as the headquarters for the Defense Mobile, the local coastal defense force, based in Landévennec. The ship was quickly returned to her original name after the old ironclad Victorieuse was allocated that name in 1900. She served in that capacity for just a year before being sold to M. Morice on 21 February 1901; she was subsequently broken up in 1904.
