= Iphigénie (disambiguation) =

Iphigénie is a 1674 play by French playwright Jean Racine.

Iphigénie may also refer to:

== Ships ==
- French ship Iphigénie, various French Navy ships
- Iphigénie-class frigate, an 18th century French Navy ship class

== People ==
- Iphigénie Chrysochoou (1909–2008), Greek writer
- Iphigénie Decaux-Milet-Moreau (1778–1862), French flower painter

== Characters in operas ==
- Iphigénie en Aulide, a 1774 opera by Gluck
- Iphigénie en Tauride, a 1779 opera by Gluck
- Iphigénie en Tauride (Desmarets and Campra), a 1704 opera by Campra
- Iphigénie en Tauride (Piccinni), a 1781 opera by Piccinni

== See also ==
- Iphigenia (disambiguation)
