= French cruiser Sfax =

Protected cruiser of the French Navy

- Sfax early in her career as originally configured

Class overview
- Preceded by: None
- Succeeded by: Tage

History

France
- Name: Sfax
- Namesake: Bombardment of Sfax during the French conquest of Tunisia
- Builder: Arsenal de Brest
- Laid down: 26 July 1882
- Launched: 26 May 1884
- Commissioned: 17 January 1887
- Decommissioned: 13 August 1905
- Stricken: 1906
- Fate: Broken up, 1910

General characteristics
- Type: Protected cruiser
- Displacement: 4,888 t (4,811 long tons)
- Length: 96.08 m (315 ft 3 in) loa
- Beam: 15 m (49 ft 3 in)
- Draft: 6.77 m (22 ft 3 in)
- Installed power: 12 × fire-tube boilers; 6,495 ihp (4,843 kW)
- Propulsion: 2 × compound steam engines; 2 × screw propellers
- Sail plan: Barque rig
- Speed: 16.71 knots (30.95 km/h; 19.23 mph)
- Range: 4,200 nmi (7,800 km; 4,800 mi) at 10.5 kn (19.4 km/h; 12.1 mph)
- Complement: 470
- Armament: 6 × 164 mm (6.5 in) guns; 10 × 138 mm (5.4 in) guns; 8 × 37 mm (1.5 in) guns; 5 × 356 mm (14 in) torpedo tubes
- Armor: Deck: 30 mm (1.2 in); Conning tower: 30 mm; Sponsons: 8 mm (0.31 in)

Sfax was a protected cruiser built for the French Navy in the 1880s. She was the first vessel of the type to be built for the French Navy, which was a development from earlier unprotected cruisers like Milan. Unlike the earlier vessels, Sfax carried an armor deck that covered her propulsion machinery and ammunition magazines. Intended to be used as a commerce raider in the event of war with Great Britain, Sfax was rigged as a barque to supplement her engines on long voyages abroad. She was armed with a main battery of six 164 mm (6.5 in) guns and a variety of lighter weapons.

Sfaxhad a relatively uneventful career. She spent most of her career alternating between the Mediterranean, Northern, and Reserve Squadrons. During this period, she was primarily occupied with conducting training exercises; while in the Reserve Squadron, she was kept in commission for only part of the year. She briefly served on the North American station in 1899, but by 1901, had been reduced to reserve. She was struck from the naval register in 1906 and subsequently broken up.

== Design ==
Sketch of Sfax in her original configuration

The design for Sfax traces its origin to work the French naval engineer Louis-Émile Bertin prepared in 1870 for a new type of ironclad river monitors that incorporated a highly subdivided layer of watertight compartments intended to control flooding from battle damage. The proposal was not taken up, but Bertin suggested a similar feature on a small cruiser in 1872, which was also rejected in 1873.

In 1878, the French Navy embarked on a program of cruiser construction authorized by the Conseil des Travaux (Council of Works) for a strategy aimed at attacking British merchant shipping in the event of war. The program called for ships of around 3,000 long tons (3,048 t) with a speed of 16 knots (30 km/h; 18 mph). The first three vessels of the program—Naïade, Aréthuse, and Dubourdieu—were traditional unprotected cruisers with wooden hulls, while the fourth vessel, Milan, was a transitional steel-hulled design. The Navy ordered a fifth ship, to have been a sister ship to Dubourdieu named Capitaine Lucas, but by this time, the British Royal Navy had begun building their own protected cruisers.

The Director of Materiel, Victorin Sabattier, temporarily vacated his position in 1881 due to illness, and Bertin used the opportunity to protest the beginning of construction of Capitaine Lucas in light of developments in the Royal Navy; he was able to convince Sabattier's replacement, Alfred Lebelin de Dionne, that a version of his 1873 proposal would better suit French needs, and he in turn convinced the Minister of the Navy, Georges Charles Cloué, to cancel Capitaine Lucas in favor of Bertin's proposal. Improvements suggested by the Conseil were incorporated into the ship, which was ordered in 1882, by which time Auguste Gougeard had replaced Cloué as the naval minister. The ship proved to be a successful design and she provided the basis for subsequent vessels, beginning with Tage.

=== Characteristics and machinery ===
Profile drawing of Sfax in her original configuration

Sfax was 90.03 m (295 ft 4 in) long at the waterline, 91.56 m (300 ft 5 in) long between perpendiculars, and 96.08 m (315 ft 3 in) long overall. She had a beam of 15 m (49 ft 3 in) and an average draft of 6.77 m (22 ft 3 in), which increased to 7.65 m (25.1 ft) aft. The ship had a designed displacement of 4,561 t (4,489 long tons) but displaced 4,888 t (4,811 long tons) as completed.

Her hull featured a pronounced ram bow that was reinforced to allow it to bear the impact of colliding with another ship, along with short fore and sterncastles. The hull was constructed with steel frames and wrought iron plating, and below the waterline it was sheathed in a layer of timber and copper plate to protect it from biofouling on extended cruises. As was typical for French warships of the period, she had a pronounced tumblehome shape and an overhanging stern. Her superstructure was minimal, consisting primarily of a small conning tower forward. Steering was controlled with a single rudder. Her crew consisted of 470 officers and enlisted men.

The ship was propelled by a pair of horizontal, 2-cylinder compound steam engines, each driving a screw propeller. Steam was provided by twelve coal-burning fire-tube boilers that were ducted into two funnels located amidships. To supplement the steam engines on long voyages, she was originally fitted with a barque sailing rig with three masts. The sail area totaled 1,990 square meters (21,400 sq ft), though Sfax proved to perform poorly under sail.

The power plant was rated to produce 7,680 indicated horsepower (5,730 kW) at 90 revolutions per minute for a top speed of 16 knots (30 km/h; 18 mph). On speed trials conducted in May 1887, the machinery only reached 6,495 ihp (4,843 kW), but the ship nevertheless made a top speed of 16.71 knots (30.95 km/h; 19.23 mph) using forced draft. The ship could not effectively steam at that speed, however, as excessive vibration particularly affected the aft engine at speeds above 13 knots (24 km/h; 15 mph); in service, the crew could not push the engines faster than 65 rpm, limiting the speed to 15 knots (28 km/h; 17 mph). Coal storage amounted to 710 t (700 long tons) normally and up to 1,000 t (980 long tons) at full load. This provided a cruising range of 4,200 nautical miles (7,800 km; 4,800 mi) at an economical speed of 10.5 knots (19.4 km/h; 12.1 mph).

=== Armament and armor ===
Illustration of Sfax, c. 1891

The ship was armed with a main battery of six 164.7 mm (6.48 in) M1881 28-caliber guns carried in individual pivot mounts. Four of the guns were mounted in sponsons on the upper deck, two on each broadside, while the other two were placed in embrasures in the forecastle. These weapons were supported by a secondary battery of ten 138.6 mm (5.46 in) M1881 30-caliber guns that were carried in a main deck battery amidships. For close-range defense against torpedo boats, she carried eight 37 mm (1.5 in) guns in individual mounts. Some of these were carried in fighting tops in the masts. She also carried five 356 mm (14 in) torpedo tubes in her hull above the waterline; two were placed forward, one on each broadside, and the last in the stern. Sfax also carried a pair of 65 mm (2.6 in) M1881 field guns that could be sent ashore with a landing party.

The ship was protected by an armor deck that consisted of wrought iron that was 30 mm (1.2 in) thick layered on 10 m (33 ft) of deck plating. Bertin had intended the deck to be 38 mm (1.5 in) thick, but a reduction was necessary to save weight that could be used to strengthen the deck supports. The deck was placed low in the ship, about 0.75 m (2 ft 6 in) below the waterline, with downward sloping sides that were reduced slightly in thickness to 28 mm (1.1 in). Between the armor and main deck, a cofferdam coupled with watertight compartmentalization was employed to contain flooding from damage. This section was divided by seven longitudinal and sixteen transverse bulkheads, some of which were filled with water-absorbing cellulose. Some of the compartments were used to store coal, which provided an additional measure of protection against enemy fire. Her conning tower had 30 mm sides and the 164.7 mm guns had 8 mm (0.31 in) plating on their sponsons.

=== Modifications ===
Sfax was refitted and modified a number of times over the course of her career. Shortly after entering service, the sailing rig was modified in an attempt to improve the ship's sailing characteristics in 1888. New screws were fitted in October that year to try to address the vibration problem, but these did not correct the problem and her original propellers were restored in February 1889. Her bowsprit was replaced with a jibboom in 1892. A more comprehensive refit followed between March 1893 and May 1894, which saw the ship's main and secondary battery was replaced with 30-cal. M1881 quick-firing guns of the same bore diameter. Her sailing rig was also removed entirely at that time, and heavy military masts were installed in its place. Some of the light guns were placed in fighting tops on the masts to improve their fields of fire.

Another extensive modernization took place between August 1897 and August 1898. Her original boilers were replaced with new fire-tube boilers manufactured by Indret. All three military masts were removed; and the fore and mizzen masts were replaced with simple pole masts, but the base of the main mast was converted into a ventilation shaft. The ship's light armament was revised to six 47 mm (1.9 in) M1885 QF guns, four 37 mm QF guns, and six 37 mm revolvers. Those light guns that had been fitted in the tops were redistributed along the upper deck. She retained the two 65 mm landing guns, but three of her torpedo tubes were removed, leaving only the broadside tubes installed.

== Service history ==
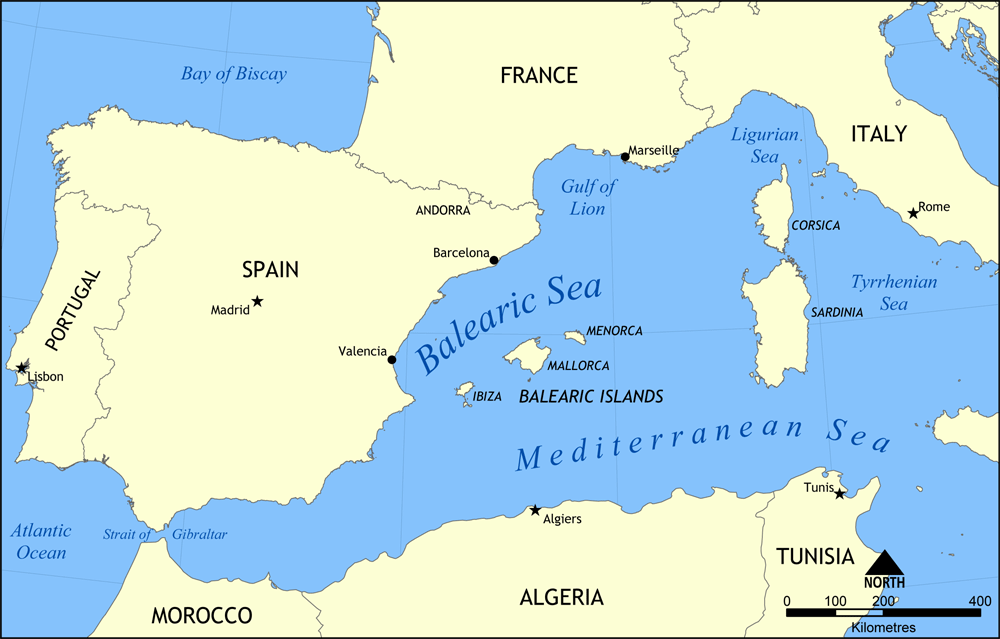
Map of the western Mediterranean, where Sfax operated for most of the 1890s

=== Construction – 1894 ===
Sfax was laid down at the Arsenal de Brest in Brest, France on 26 July 1882. The ship was named for the bombardment of Sfax during the French conquest of Tunisia in 1881. She was launched on 26 May 1884, and fitting-out work thereafter commenced, including the installation of her engines, which lasted from 10 October 1885 to 1 September 1886. The ship was commissioned for sea trials on 17 January 1887, which were conducted off Brest. Trials were completed on 7 June, when she was placed in full commission; eight days later she departed Brest for Toulon in the Mediterranean Sea. Immediately upon entering service, Sfax participated in the fleet maneuvers with the Mediterranean Fleet that had already begun on 11 June. Following the conclusion of the exercises, Sfax was placed in reserve.

By 1890, Sfax had been transferred to the Northern Squadron, which was based in the English Channel. She took part in that year's naval maneuvers, along with the ironclads Marengo, Océan, and Suffren, the torpedo cruiser Epervier, and several other vessels. The exercises began on 2 July and involved the ships attacking several coastal defense ships and armored gunboats in a simulated amphibious assault of an "eastern" (i.e., German) squadron on the defending French squadron represented by the coastal defense ships. The exercise concluded on the 5th, with the Northern Squadron having failed to neutralize the defending forces and effect a landing. Joint maneuvers were held in 1891 with the combined Mediterranean Fleet and Northern Squadron. The ships of the Mediterranean Fleet arrived in Brest on 2 July and began the maneuvers four days later; the exercises ended on 25 July.

The following year, Sfax was transferred to the Mediterranean Fleet, where she served as part of the reconnaissance force for the main French battle fleet, along with the cruisers Tage, Amiral Cécille, and Lalande. The ship participated in that year's fleet maneuvers, which began on 23 June and concluded on 11 July. By 1893, Sfax had been reduced to the Reserve Squadron, where she spent six months of the year on active service with full crews for maneuvers; the rest of the year was spent laid up with a reduced crew. At that time, the unit also included several older ironclads and the cruisers Tage, Davout, Forbin, and Condor. During this period, the ship was refitted between March 1893 and May 1894 at Marseille. Sfax took part in the fleet maneuvers after returning to service in 1894, still part of the Reserve Squadron; from 9 to 16 July, the ships involved took on supplies in Toulon for the maneuvers that began later on the 16th. A series of exercises included shooting practice, a blockade simulation, and scouting operations in the western Mediterranean. The maneuvers concluded on 3 August.

=== 1895–1910 ===
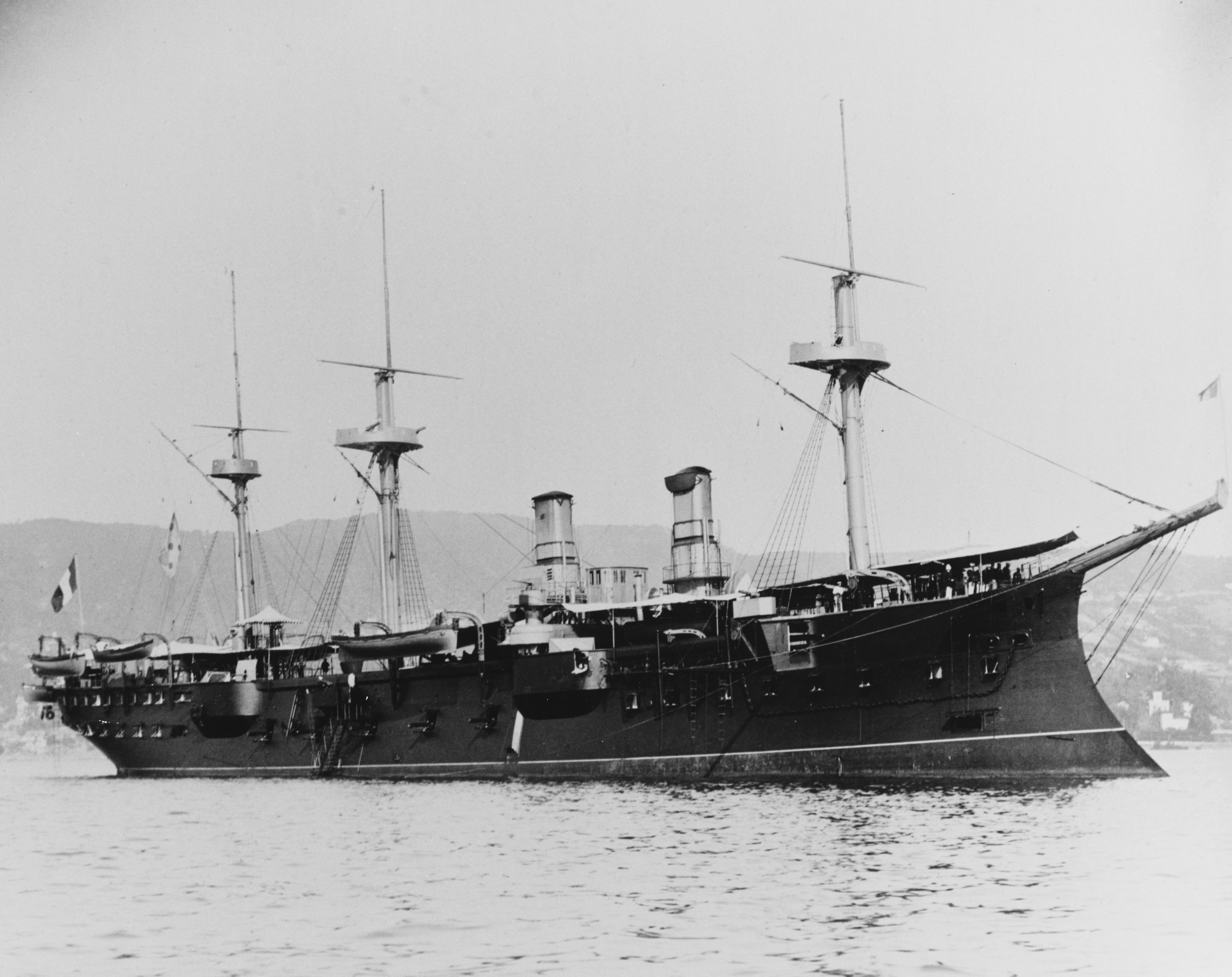
Sfax after her refit of 1888–1889 and before that of 1897–1898

In late January 1895, Sfax and the ironclad Amiral Duperré took part in an experimental bombardment of a simulated coastal fortification on Levant Island. The test lasted six hours and was carried out over the course of three days, so that the effect of shelling could be studied throughout the experiment. It involved over a thousand shots between the two ships, firing calibers ranging from 10 to 34 cm (3.9 to 13.4 in). Neither ship was able to significantly damage the fortifications, though several of the guns were damaged and shell fragments would have inflicted casualties among gun crews. The French determined that an excessive amount of ammunition was required to neutralize the guns, and had the fortification been returning fire, both ships likely would have been seriously damaged. Sfax was still serving in the unit in 1895, along with the cruisers Forbin and Milan. That year she took part in the fleet maneuvers, which began on 1 July and concluded on the 27th. She was assigned to "Fleet A", which along with "Fleet B" represented the French fleet, and was tasked with defeating the hostile "Fleet C", which represented the Italian fleet.

She remained in the Reserve Squadron in 1896, and participated in the annual maneuvers as part of the Reserve Squadron's cruiser screen, along with the cruisers Lalande, Amiral Cécille, Milan, and Léger. The maneuvers for that year took place from 6 to 30 July and the Reserve Squadron served as the simulated enemy. In mid-1897, Sfax was reactivated to participate in the second phase of the exercises of the Northern Squadron. These lasted from 18 to 21 July 1897, and the scenario saw the Sfax and Tagesimulate a hostile fleet steaming from the Mediterranean Sea to attack France's Atlantic coast. In the course of the exercises, the Northern Squadron successfully intercepted the cruisers and "defeated" them.

Sfax was modernized again between August 1898 and August 1899 at Brest; in addition to repairs to her machinery, she had her military masts replaced with pole masts. In September 1898, after the work was completed, Sfax recommissioned and was assigned to the North American station, along with the unprotected cruiser Dubourdieu. There, she relieved the old unprotected cruiser Rigault de Genouilly. After Alfred Dreyfus was pardoned that year, Sfax carried him back from Devil's Island in French Guiana to Port Haliguen. By January 1901, Sfax had been reduced to the 2nd category of reserve, and on 20 January 1903, she was allocated to the special reserve. Decommissioned on 13 August 1905 and then struck from the naval register in 1906, Sfax was used as a storage hulk for shells and propellant charges from 1906 to 1909. She was then placed on the sale list on 26 May 1909 and ultimately sold to ship breakers on 25 August 1910.
