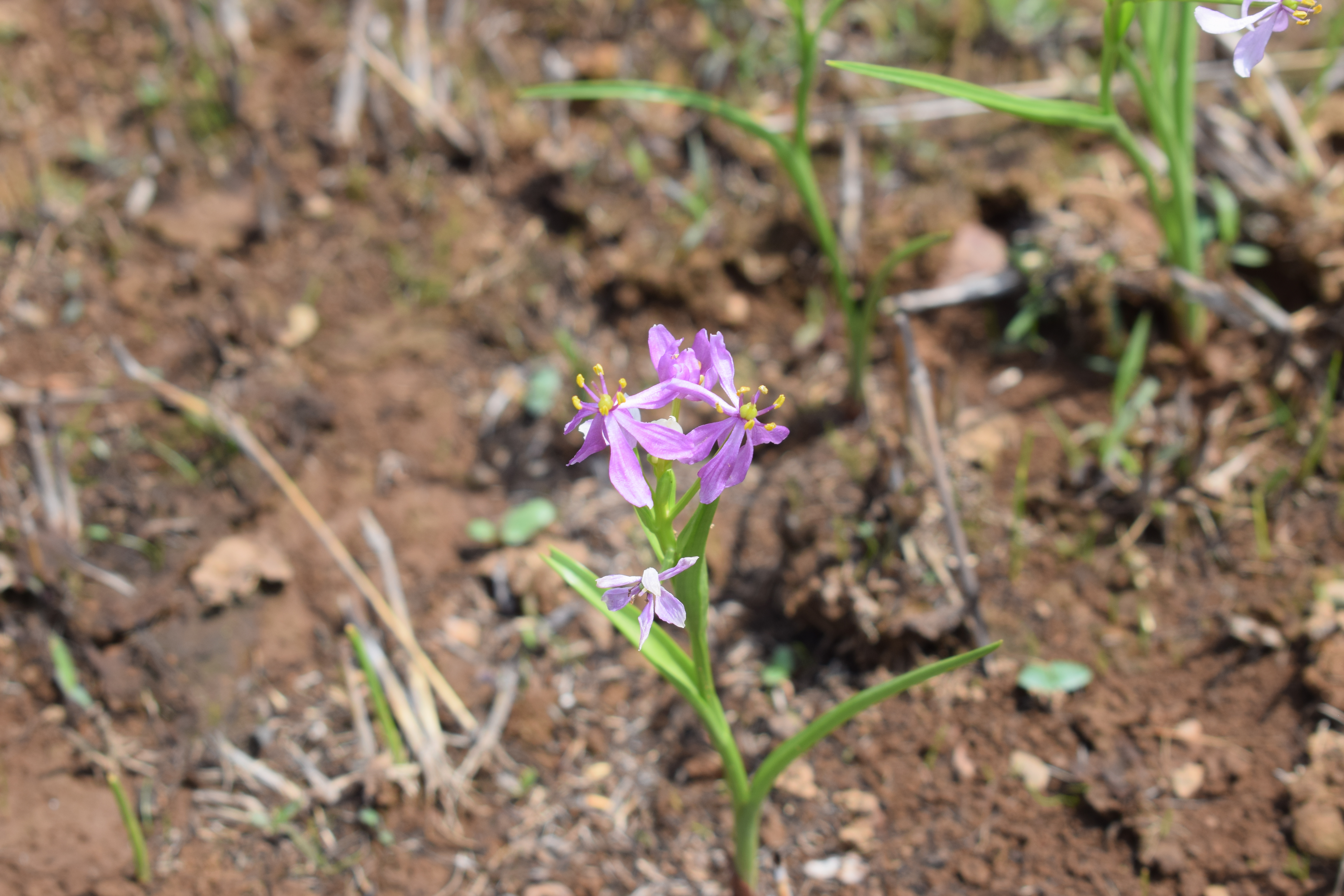

Conservation status
- Endangered (IUCN 3.1)

Scientific classification
- Kingdom: Plantae
- Clade: Embryophytes
- Clade: Tracheophytes
- Clade: Spermatophytes
- Clade: Angiosperms
- Clade: Monocots
- Order: Liliales
- Family: Colchicaceae
- Genus: Iphigenia
- Species: I. ratnagirica

Binomial name
- Iphigenia ratnagirica S.M.Almeida & M.R.Almeida

Synonyms
- Camptorrhiza indica S.R.Yadav, N.P.Singh & B.Mathew

= Iphigenia ratnagirica =

Species of flowering plant

Iphigenia ratnagirica is a small herb, endemic to the northern Western Ghats region of India. It is a tuberous geophyte in the family Colchicaceae.

== Distribution ==
Iphigenia ratnagirica is only known from the lateritic plateaus of Ratnagiri, Maharashtra, India. It grows on open rocky areas at elevations of 50–200 m (160–660 ft).

== Conservation ==
Iphigenia ratnagirica is listed as endangered on the International Union for the Conservation of Nature's Red List. It is threatened by trampling, quarrying, developments, grazing, and invasive plants.
