= French cruiser Naïade =

French naval vessel of the 1880s

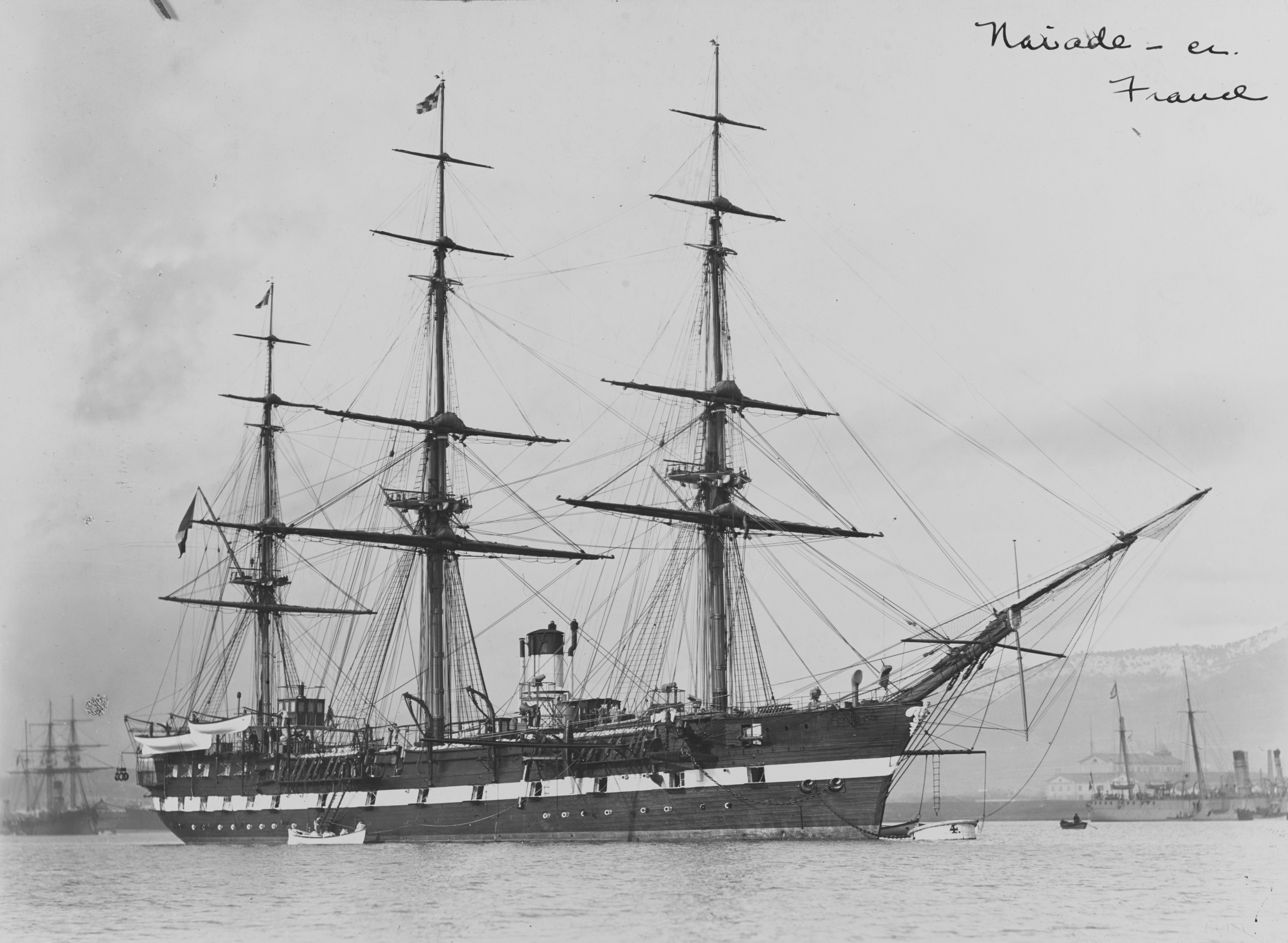
- Naïade in harbor, date unknown

Class overview
- Preceded by: Iphigénie
- Succeeded by: Aréthuse

History

France
- Name: Naïade
- Builder: Arsenal de Brest
- Laid down: 25 February 1878
- Launched: 6 January 1881
- Completed: June 1883
- Commissioned: June 1882
- Decommissioned: 1895
- Stricken: 1 December 1899
- Fate: Broken up, 1900

General characteristics
- Type: Unprotected cruiser
- Displacement: 3,527 t (3,471 long tons)
- Length: 74.86 m (246 ft) lpp
- Beam: 14.15 m (46 ft 5 in)
- Draft: 6.69 m (22 ft)
- Installed power: 8 × fire-tube boilers; 2,800 indicated horsepower (2,100 kW)
- Propulsion: 1 × compound steam engine; 1 × screw propeller
- Sail plan: Full ship rig
- Speed: 14.7 knots (27.2 km/h; 16.9 mph)
- Complement: 439
- Armament: 4 × 165 mm (6.5 in) guns; 22 × 140 mm (5.5 in) guns; 2 × 100 mm (3.9 in) guns; 8 × 1-pounder Hotchkiss revolver cannon; 1 × 350 mm (13.8 in) torpedo tube

Naïade was an unprotected cruiser of the French Navy that was built in the late 1870s and early 1880s. The ship was laid down in 1878 and completed in 1883. Intended to serve as a long-range commerce raider, the ship was fitted with a sailing rig to supplement its steam engine on long voyages, and she carried an armament of four 165 mm (6.5 in) and twenty-two 140 mm (5.5 in) guns. She was among the final French unprotected cruisers, thereafter being replaced by more durable protected cruisers.

After entering service in 1883, Naïade was sent to Madagascar to serve as the flagship of the squadron based there during the First Madagascar expedition. She returned to France in 1886 and spent the next several years as a training ship. She visited the United States in 1893 before being placed in reserve in 1895. She remained out of service for the next four years, ultimately being struck from the naval register in 1899 and sold to ship breakers the following year.

== Design ==
In 1878, the French Navy embarked on a program of cruiser construction authorized by the Conseil des Travaux (Council of Works) for a strategy aimed at attacking British merchant shipping in the event of war. The program called for ships of around 3,000 long tons (3,048 t) with a speed of 16 knots (30 km/h; 18 mph). Four vessels were ordered, including Naïade; the vessels were dated designs more similar to the first screw frigates that had been built in the 1850s than the latest protected cruisers being designed abroad. Naïade and the other three vessels were the final generation of unprotected cruisers built in France, that type thereafter being replaced by protected cruisers beginning with Sfax in the early 1880s.

The design for Naïade was prepared in 1877 by Romain Leopold Eynaud, which was selected by the Conseil des Travaux on 10 July. Eynaud's work incorporated features of the British corvette Boadicea, the plans for which had been given to France by Britain. Albert Gicquel des Touches, the Minister of the Navy, and Vice Admiral Albert Roussin made several alterations to Eynaud's design, including improvements to the machinery, more modern guns, substitution of iron for wood in the hull construction, and the addition of watertight compartments. The updated plan was approved on 4 February 1878.

=== Characteristics ===
Naïade was 72.53 m (238 ft) long at the waterline and 74.86 m (246 ft) long between perpendiculars, with a beam of 14.15 m (46 ft 5 in) and an average draft of 6.69 m (22 ft). She displaced 3,527 t (3,471 long tons). Her hull was constructed with wood; she had a clipper bow and an overhanging stern. She had a forecastle and sterncastle. The ship had no armor protection. Her crew consisted of 496 officers and enlisted men.

The ship was propelled by a single horizontal, 3-cylinder compound steam engine that drove a screw propeller. Steam was provided by eight coal-burning fire-tube boilers that were ducted into a single funnel located amidships. Coal storage amounted to 450 long tons (460 t). The power plant was rated to produce 3,300 indicated horsepower (2,500 kW), but during her initial speed testing, they only reached 2,412 ihp (1,799 kW) for a top speed of 13.87 knots (25.69 km/h; 15.96 mph). The ship carried 503 t (495 long tons) of coal, and at a cruising speed of 10 knots (19 km/h; 12 mph), Naïade could steam for 5,810 nautical miles (10,760 km; 6,690 mi). To supplement her steam engines, she was fitted with a three-masted full ship rig.

As originally built, the ship was armed with a main battery of four 164.7 mm (6.48 in) M1870 21-caliber (cal.) guns; two were placed in embrasures in the bow as chase guns, and the other pair were at the stern. These were supported by a secondary battery of sixteen 138.6 mm (5.46 in) M1870 21.3-cal. guns in a broadside battery, eight guns per side. In addition, she carried a pair of 350 mm (14 in) torpedo tubes above the waterline; these were on moveable carriages that were typically placed in broadside ports just ahead of the battery, but could be moved to launching ports in the bow or stern.

The ship's armament underwent several alterations over the course of her career. As completed in 1883, the two stern 165 mm guns were replaced with 138.6 M1870M 21.3-cal. guns, and ten of the battery guns were replaced with the updated M1870M variants. Ten 37 mm (1.5 in) guns were added to provide close-range defense against torpedo boats. In 1886, the remaining 164.7 mm guns were replaced with M1881 guns of the same caliber, but they were moved down a deck level. A pair of 65 mm (2.6 in) guns and a single 47 mm (1.9 in) gun were added in 1890, and three 37 mm M1885 quick-firing guns were installed in 1894.

== Service history ==
The new ship was ordered on 24 January 1878 and the keel for Naïade was laid down on 25 February at the Arsenal de Brest. She was launched on 6 January 1881 and was commissioned to begin sea trials in June 1882. The initial testing revealed significant problems with her engines. She was placed in reserve for modifications on 9 August, before being recommissioned on 20 February 1883. She carried out further trials, which lasted until 11 May. The ship was pronounced complete and then reduced to reserve status on 1 June.

=== Madagascar campaign ===
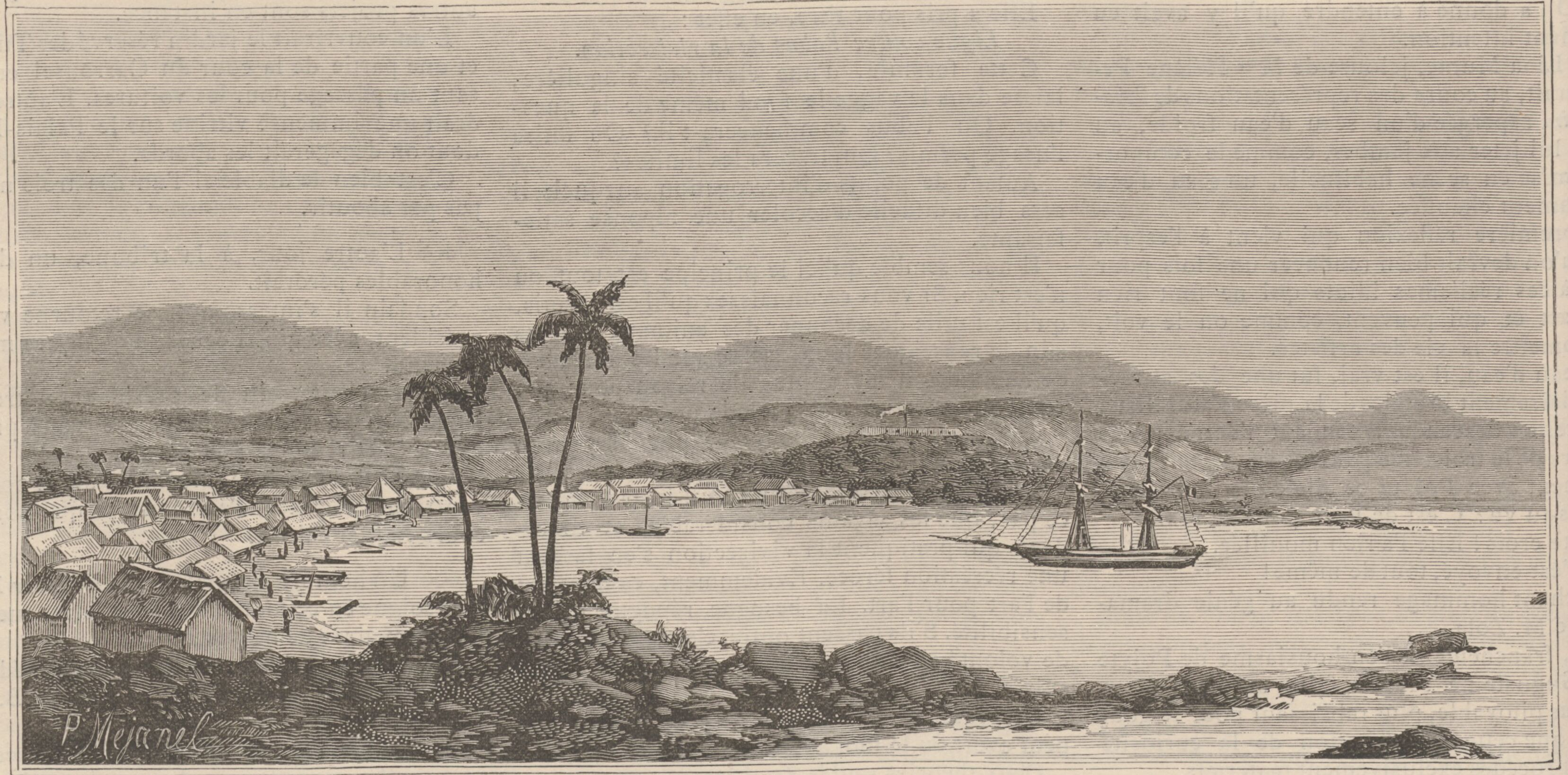
Sketch of Tamatave during the First Madagascar expedition

Beginning in 1882, the French government decided to seize Madagascar as a colony, based on claims during the reign of Napoleon III in 1868. The navy sent the cruiser Beautemps-Beaupré with Admiral Pierre Pierre to lead an expedition to invade the island. By April 1883, Pierre had organized a squadron that included Forfait, Beautemps-Beaupré, the screw frigate Flore, the cruiser Vaudreuil, the aviso Boursaint, and the gunboat Picque. By August, the First Madagascar expedition had captured the city of Tamatave, but the Merina government steadfastly refused French ultimatums to surrender. On 10 August, Naïade was recommissioned to reinforce Pierre's squadron, where she replaced Flore as the squadron flagship. She escorted a contingent of 700 men aboard the transport Creuse, which were to strengthen the garrison at Tamatave; embarked was Rear Admiral Paul-Émile Miot, who was to take command of the campaign. The force sailed from Toulon on 9 April 1884 and arrived off Madagascar on 9 May.

Miot immediately instituted a blockade of the island, though he lacked enough ships to control the coastline. Miot divided his squadron into two divisions, and assigned Naïade to the east coast division, along with Beautemps-Beaupré, Boursaint, the gunboat Capricorne, and two support vessels. Because of the force limitations, the blockade focused on a few ports, including Mahanoro and Fenoarivo Atsinanana. Fighting continued on the island through 1884 and 1885, though Naïade saw little action during this period, as much of the coastal bombardment work was done by the smaller cruisers and shallow-draft gunboats. These actions culminated in a major attempt to break the Merina siege of Tamatave in September 1885. Naïade contributed men to a column of around 600 men who attacked the Merina trenches outside the city and provided fire support to the attack, which was repulsed.

On 11 November, a pair of Merina representatives boarded Naïade with a letter for Miot indicating a willingness to negotiate; Miot sent word of the development by way of the cruiser Limier to Zanzibar. The latter cruiser brought a French diplomat from Zanzibar, arriving back at Tamatave on 13 December. Negotiations began at a neutral site, but by 15 December, the groups found the conditions to be uncomfortable, so Miot offered to host the discussions aboard Naïade. A peace treaty was finally signed aboard Naïade on 17 December. The French fired a 21-gun salute to mark the occasion, and the Merina negotiators invited Miot to join them for a ceremonial dinner. The treaty, which went into effect on 13 March 1886, permanently gave France control of Diego-Suarez, and allowed them to maintain the occupation of Tamatave until the Merina government paid an indemnity of 10 million francs. At that time, Miot's squadron consisted of Naïade, the cruisers Nielly, Lapérouse, Vaudreuil, and Limier; the avisos Bisson an Labourdonnais; the gunboats Pique, Capricorne, Chacal, Scorpion, Redoute, and Tirailleuse; and four transports. Over the course of the year, the squadron was reduced, and Vaudreuil, Bisson, Scorpion, Redoute, and Tirailleuse were all transferred or recalled home. Nielly relieved Naïade as the squadron flagship later in 1886.

=== Later career ===
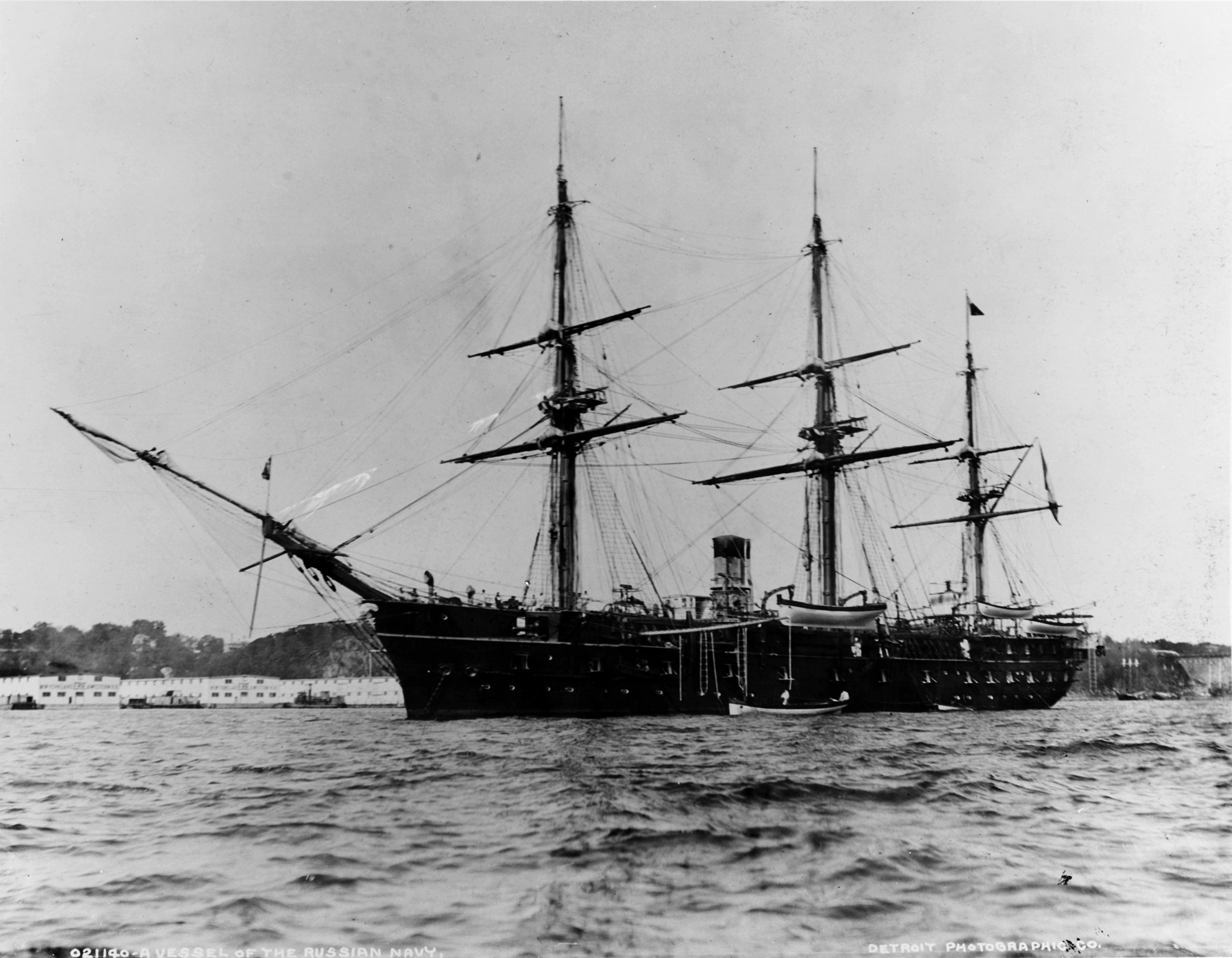
Naïade visiting the United States in 1893

After Naïade returned to France, she was modernized slightly and thereafter used for training. During the First Franco-Dahomean War in 1890, Naïade and the cruiser Roland were present in Lagos in August 1890. Dahomean forces launched an attack on French positions at nearby Cotonou on the night of 11 August. Both cruisers used their electric searchlights to illuminate enemy forces for the French garrison to engage them. By 1891, Naïade had returned home, where she was placed in the 3rd category of reserve.

The navy considered replacing the ship's M1870 guns with improved M1870M guns during another refit in 1892, but the proposal came to nothing. Instead, she received eight new Belleville boilers. In 1893, while serving as the flagship of the Division navale volante et d'instruction (Flying and Training Naval Division), she visited New York, United States. She remained with the unit the following year, which also included the unprotected cruisers Nielly and Rigault de Genouilly. That year, she and Rigault de Genouilly embarked on a training cruise to Martinique in the Caribbean Sea and then cruised off Newfoundland. They then met Nielly at Saint Pierre Island. In February 1895, the unit returned to Brest, where it was temporarily deactivated; Naïade and the other two cruisers were placed in the 2nd category of reserve. She was struck from the naval register on 1 December 1899 and was then sold on 29 March 1900 to a M. Pitel of Brest, France, where she was subsequently broken up.
