= French ship Iphigénie =

Seven ships of the French navy have borne the name Iphigénie, in honour of Iphigenia.

== French ship named Iphigénie ==
- Iphigénie (1777), a frigate, lead ship of her class. Captured by Spanish Navy in 1795, she became Ifigenia.
- Oder (1813), a frigate, was ordered as Iphigénie in 1805
- Iphigénie (1810), the British 18-pounder frigate HMS Iphigenia, built in 1805 and captured in August 1810. She was retaken by the Royal Navy in December 1810.
- Iphigénie (1810), a Pallas-class frigate, captured by British Navy 1814, becoming HMS Gloire before being sold in 1817.
- Iphigénie (1827), a 60-gun frigate.
- Iphigénie (1881), a first-class cruiser
- Iphigénie (1936), a La Melpomène-class torpedo boat
Ships of the French Navy named Iphigénie
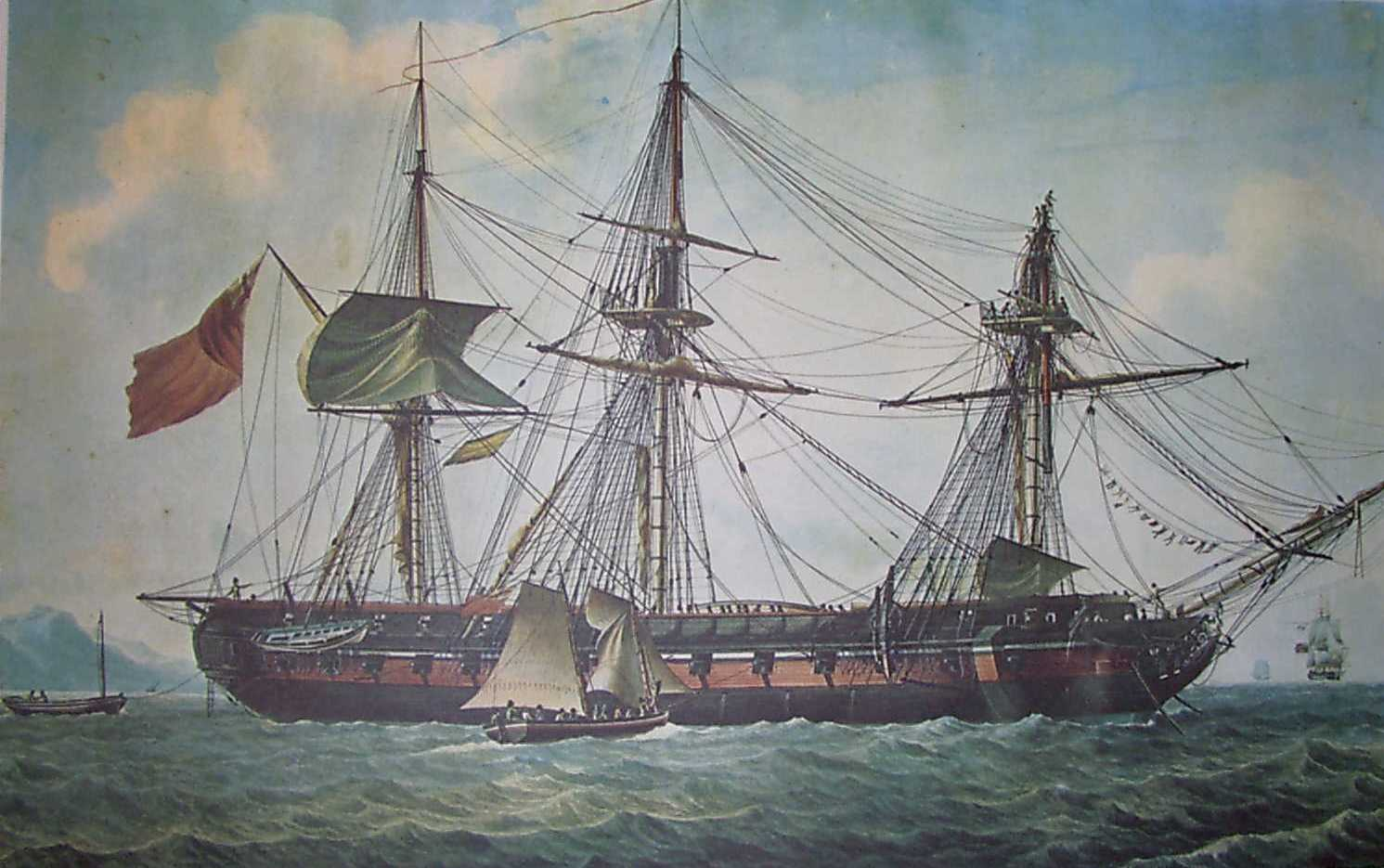
Proserpine, sister-ship of Iphigénie (1777)

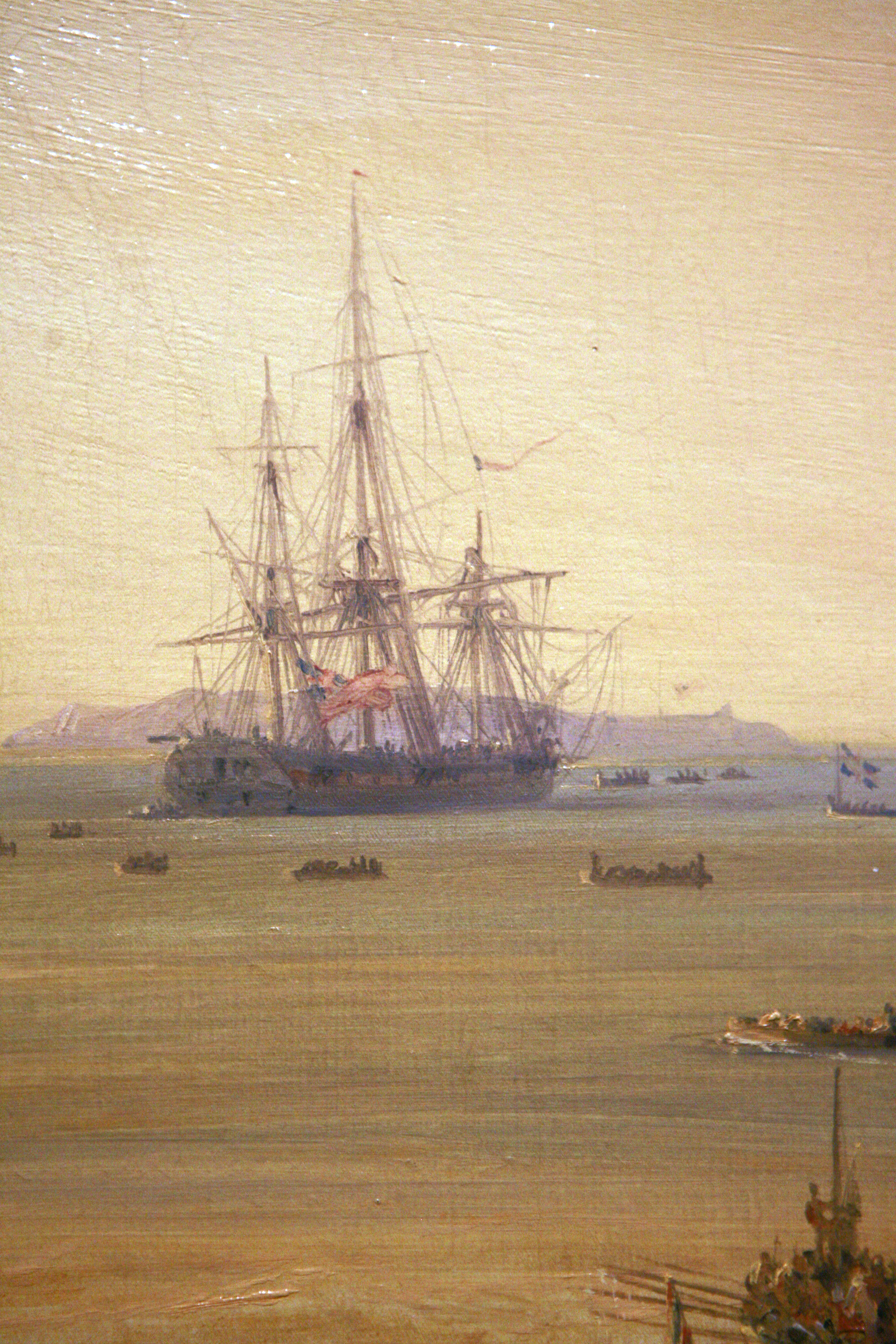
HMS Iphigenia (1810) at the Battle of Grand Port before becoming Iphigénie

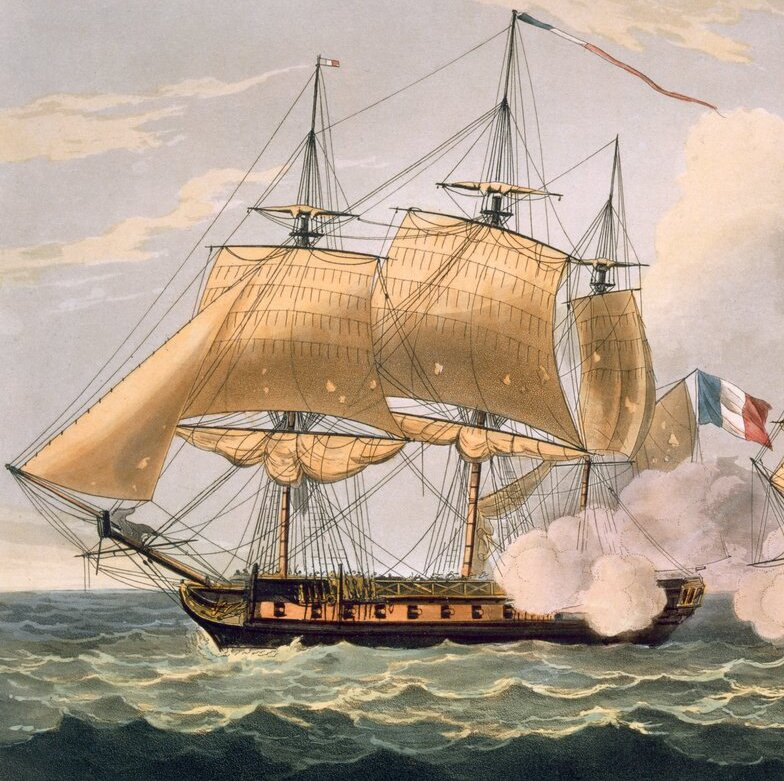
Clorinde, sister-ship of the Pallas-class Iphigénie (1810)

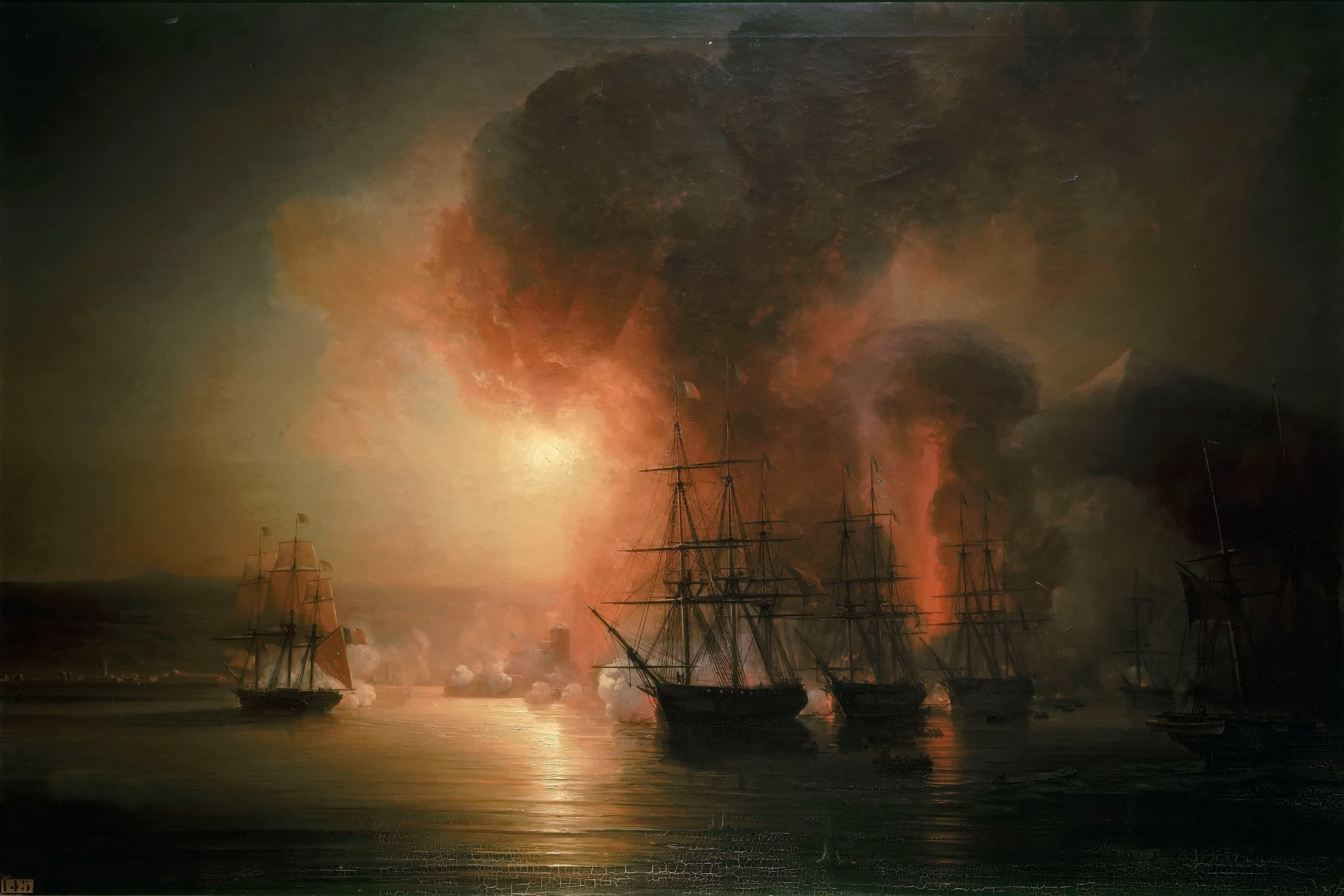
Iphigénie (1827) at rear of the line during the Battle of Veracruz

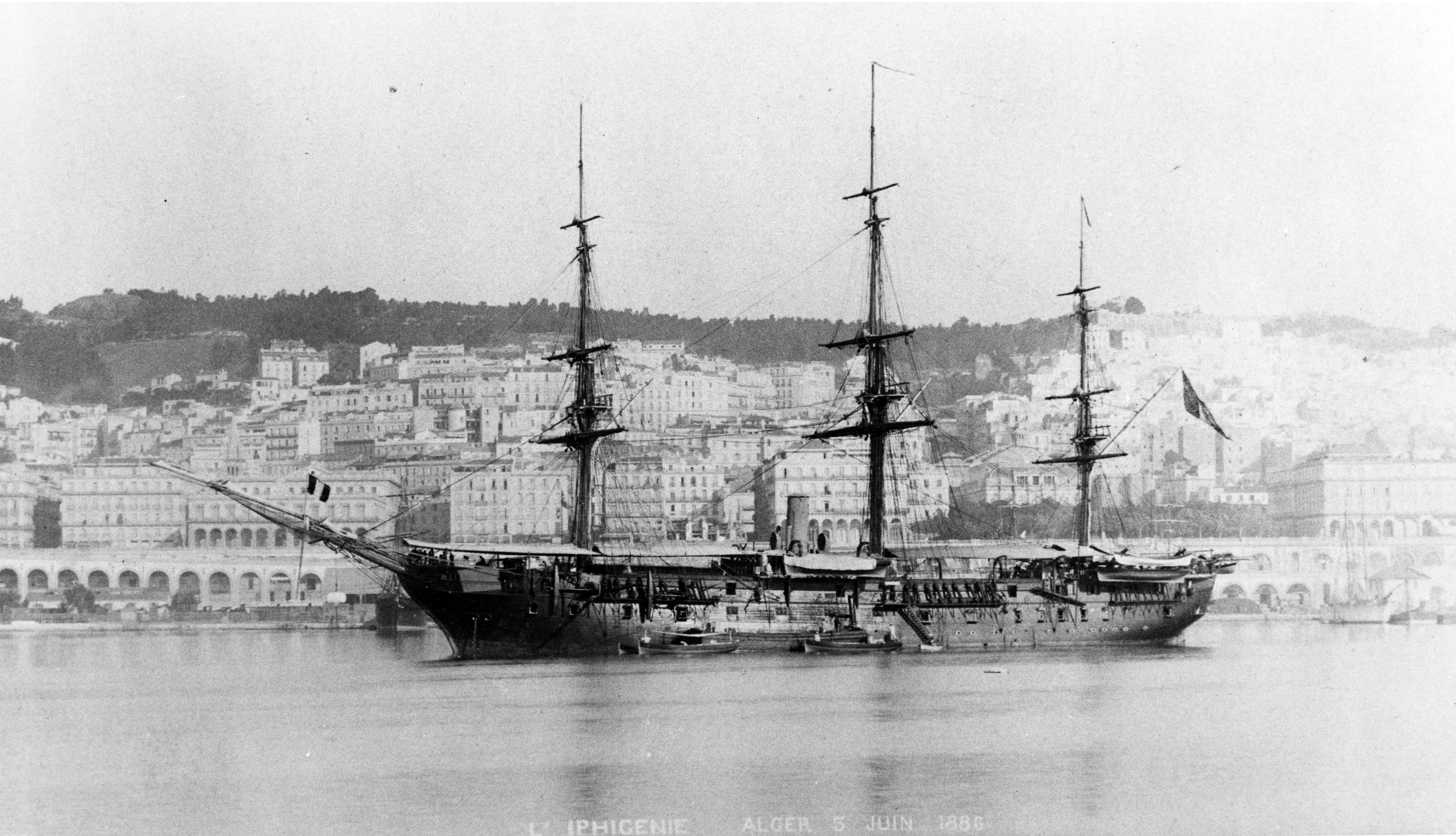
The cruiser Iphigénie (1881)

== See also ==
- HMS Iphigenia

== Notes and references ==
=== Bibliography ===
- Roche, Jean-Michel (2005). Dictionnaire des bâtiments de la flotte de guerre française de Colbert à nos jours. Vol. 1. Group Retozel-Maury Millau. pp. 372–373. ISBN 978-2-9525917-0-6. OCLC 165892922.
- Roche, Jean-Michel (2005). Dictionnaire des bâtiments de la flotte de guerre française de Colbert à nos jours. Vol. 2. Group Retozel-Maury Millau. p. 250. ISBN 978-2-9525917-0-6. OCLC 165892922.
