= Iphigenia socotrana =

Conservation status
- Least Concern (IUCN 3.1)

Scientific classification
- Kingdom: Plantae
- Clade: Tracheophytes
- Clade: Angiosperms
- Clade: Monocots
- Order: Liliales
- Family: Colchicaceae
- Genus: Iphigenia
- Species: I. socotrana

Binomial name
- Iphigenia socotrana Thulin

Species of flowering plant

Iphigenia socotrana is a species of plant in the family Colchicaceae. It is endemic to the island of Socotra in the Indian Ocean, part of the Republic of Yemen. Its natural habitats are subtropical or tropical dry shrubland and rocky areas.
