= Ifigenia in Aulide =

Ifigenia in Aulide may refer to:

- Ifigenia in Aulide, opera by Domenico Scarlatti, Rome, 1713 to libretto by Carlo Sigismondo Capeci
- Ifigenia in Aulide, opera by Caldara, Vienna, 1718 to libretto by Apostolo Zeno
- Ifigenia in Aulide, opera by Nicola Antonio Porpora, London, 1735
- Ifigenia in Aulide, opera by Giovanni Porta, Munich, 1738
- Ifigenia in Aulide, opera by Carl Heinrich Graun, Berlin, 1748, libretto by Leopoldo de' Villati after a scenario by Frederick the Great
- Ifigenia in Aulide, opera by Vicente Martín y Soler Naples, 1779
- Ifigenia in Aulide, opera by Ignaz Pleyel, Naples Teatro San Carlo, 1785
- Ifigenia in Aulide, opera by Cherubini, Turin, 1788

== See also ==
- Iphigénie en Aulide, French opera by Gluck
