= Iphigenia (opera) =

Jazz opera composed by Wayne Shorter

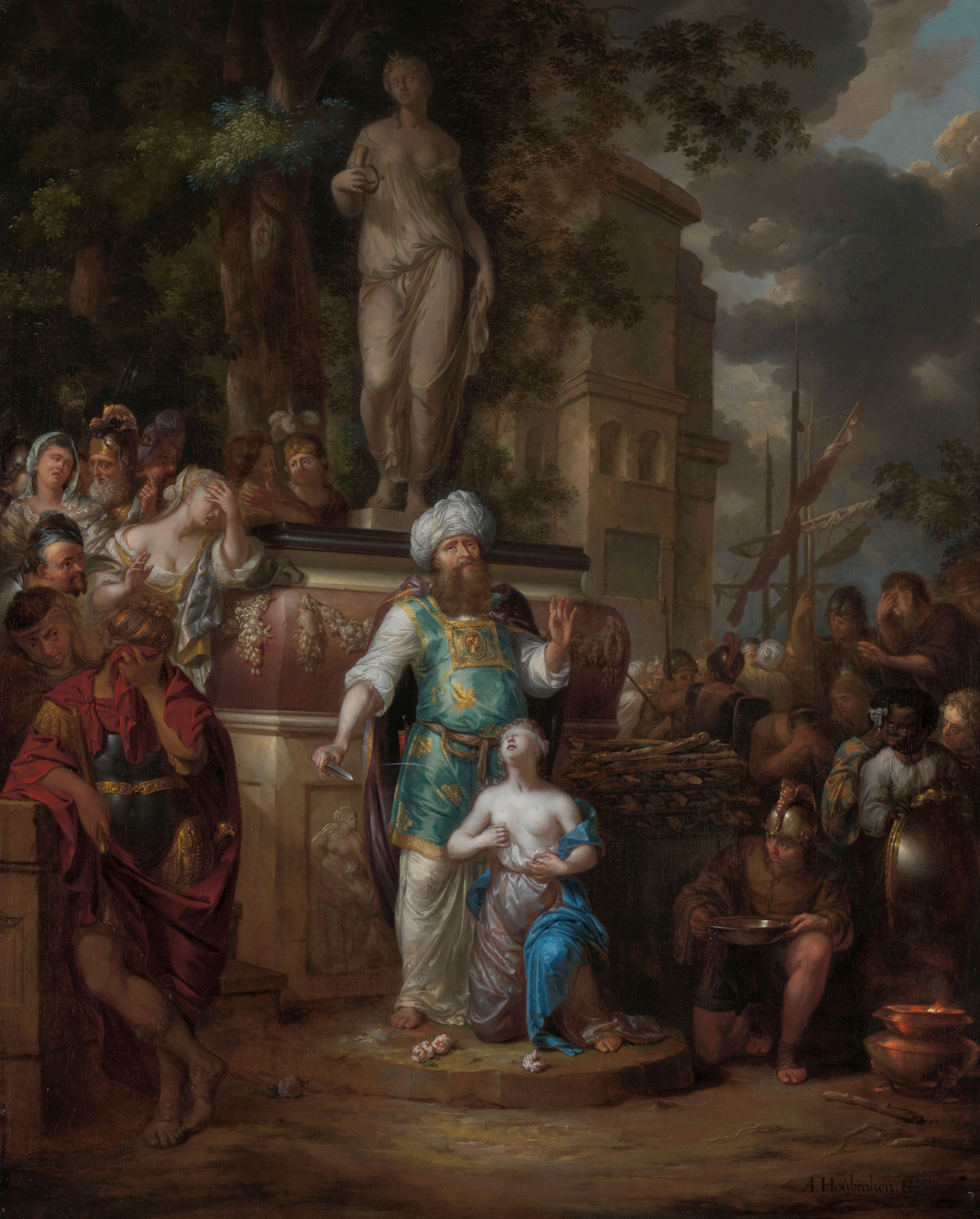
Sacrifice of Iphigenia (c.1690), Arnold Houbraken

Iphigenia is a jazz opera composed by Wayne Shorter with a libretto by Esperanza Spalding based on the mythological figure Iphigenia. The opera was premiered on November 12, 2021, at ArtsEmerson in Boston, Massachusetts, led by the conductor Clark Rundell and directed by Lileana Blain-Cruz; the set design was by Frank Gehry. According to Spalding, the opera needed revisions at the time of its premiere. The libretto was written by Spalding, with additional writing by Joy Harjo, Safiya Sinclair, and Ganavya Doraiswamy.

Shorter was 88 years old at the time of composing the work.

== Story ==
In Iphigenia in Aulis, as written by Euripides, the fate of Iphigenia is ambiguous. Iphigenia is sacrificed in order to appease the goddess Artemis to send favourable winds to allow her father Agamemnon's fleet to sail to Troy in the Trojan War. In Spalding's telling, Iphigenia is manifested in five forms, each with their own story.

== Original Cast ==
Character	Performer
Iphigenia of the Open Tense	Esperanza Spalding
Usher	Brenda Pressley
Agamemnon	Arnold Livingston
Menelaos	Brad Walker
Iphigenia Unbound, Opera Broadcast Host	Kelly Guerra
Iphigenia of the Sea	Joanna Lynn-Jacobs
Iphigenia the Elder	Sharmay Musacchio
Iphigenia the Younger	Nivi Ravi
Iphigenia the Light	Alexandra Smither
Kalchas	Samuel White

== Instrumentation ==
The opera features a 28-instrument chamber ensemble.
