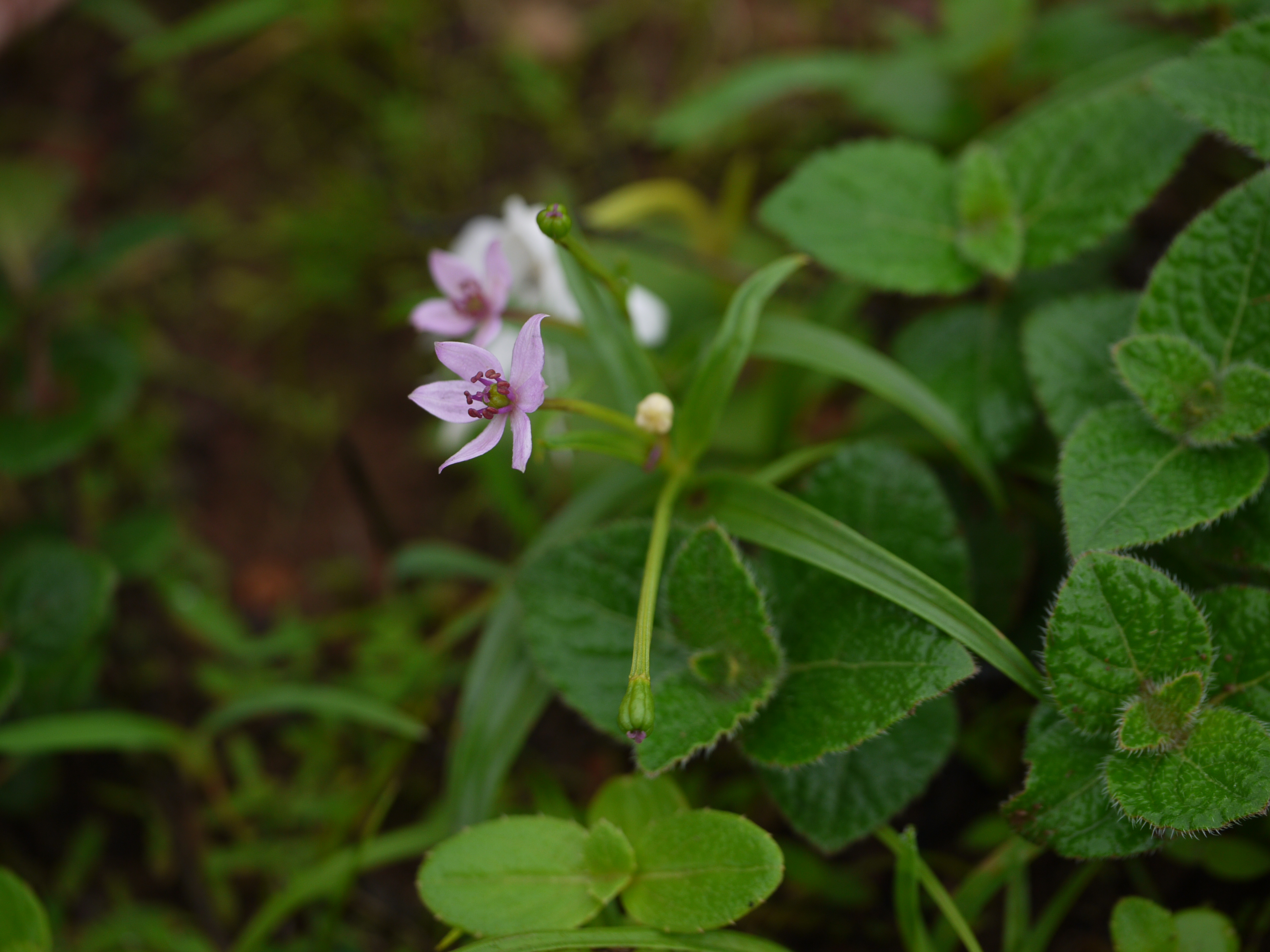
- Iphigenia stellata

Scientific classification
- Kingdom: Plantae
- Clade: Embryophytes
- Clade: Tracheophytes
- Clade: Spermatophytes
- Clade: Angiosperms
- Clade: Monocots
- Order: Liliales
- Family: Colchicaceae
- Genus: Iphigenia; Kunth

Species
- See text

= Iphigenia (plant) =

Genus of flowering plants

Iphigenia is a flowering plant in the family Colchicaceae. It was described by Kunth. It consists of about 14 species distributed from tropical Africa, over Madagascar and India to Australia. As with other taxa in Colchicaceae Iphigenia contains phenethylisoquinoline alkaloids including colchicine.

== Taxonomy ==
The genus name of Iphigenia is in reference to Iphigenia, the Greek mythological character, who was a daughter of King Agamemnon and Queen Clytemnestra, and such was a princess of Mycenae.

== Species ==
As of June 2026, Plants of the World Online accepted the following species:

=== African species ===
- Iphigenia oliveri Engl.
- Iphigenia pauciflora Martelli

=== Madagascan species ===
- Iphigenia boinensis H.Perrier
- Iphigenia robusta Baker

=== Arabian species ===
- Iphigenia socotrana Thulin

=== Indian species ===
- Iphigenia devrukhensis P.S.More & P.V.Naikwade
- Iphigenia indica (L.) A.Gray ex Kunth - range extending to China, New Guinea + Australia
- Iphigenia magnifica Ansari & R.S.Rao
- Iphigenia mysorensis Arekal & S.N.Ramaswamy
- Iphigenia pallida Baker
- Iphigenia ratnagirica Almeida & Almeida
- Iphigenia sahyadrica Ansari & R.S.Rao
- Iphigenia stellata Blatt.

=== Australian species ===
- Iphigenia brevis Jian Wang ter
