= Ifigenia in Tauride =

Ifigenia in Tauride can refer to:

- Ifigenia in Tauride (Jommelli), opera by Niccolò Jommelli, libretto by Mattia Verazi, Naples, 1771
- Ifigenia in Tauride (Traetta), opera by Tommaso Traetta, libretto by Marco Coltellini, Vienna 1767
- Ifigenia in Tauride (Majo), opera by Gian Francesco de Majo, libretto by Mattia Verazi, Mannheim, 1764
- Ifigenia in Tauride (Vinci), opera by Leonardo Vinci, libretto by Benedetto Pasqualigo, 1724

== See also ==
- Iphigenia in Tauris, play by Euripides, basis of all these operas
- Iphigénie en Tauride, opera by Gluck
- Iphigénie en Tauride (Campra), opera by André Campra
- Iphigénie en Tauride (Piccinni), opera by Piccinni
