= French cruiser Iphigénie =

French naval vessel of the 1880s

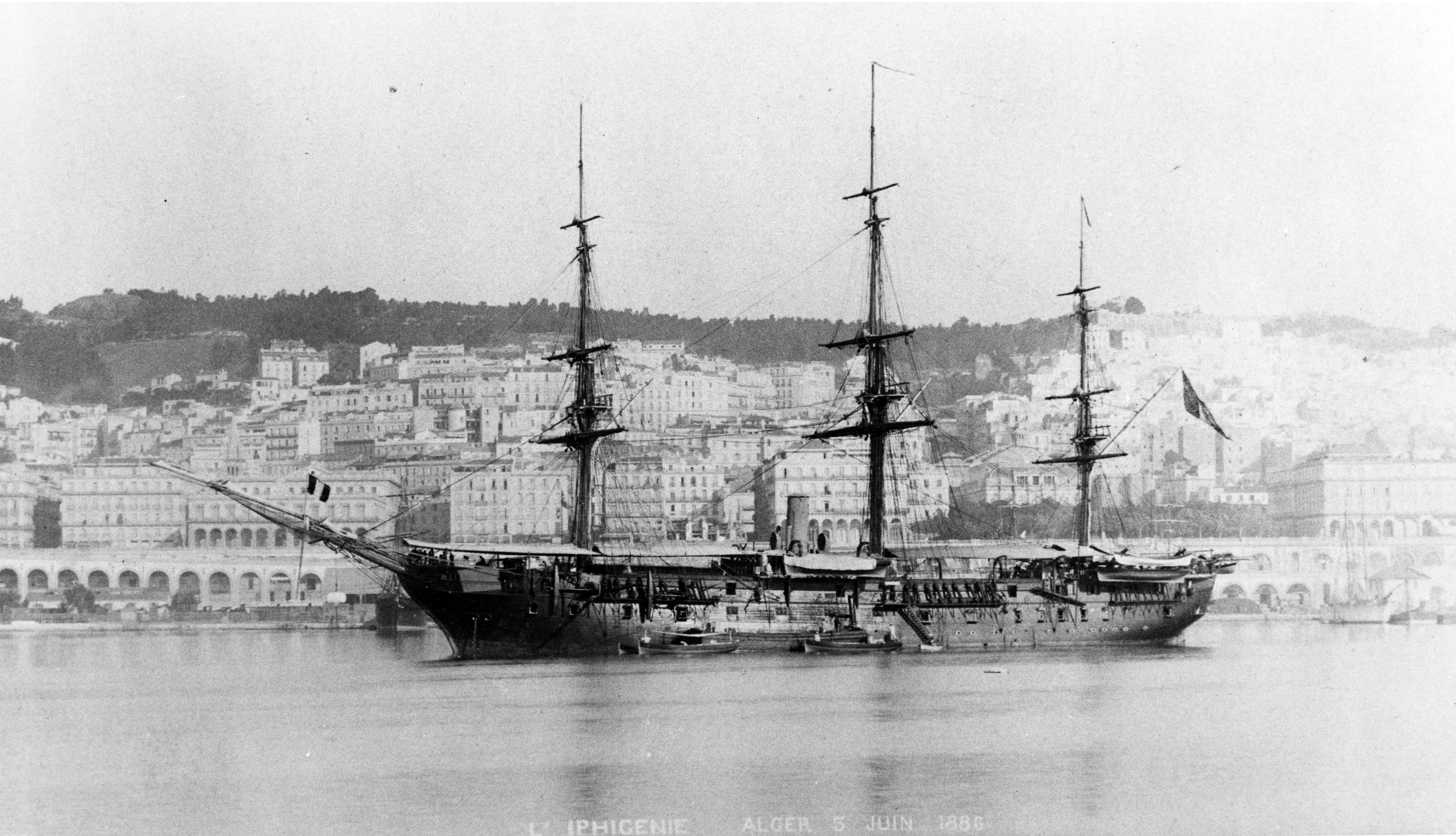
- Iphigénie in Algiers in 1886

Class overview
- Preceded by: Villars class
- Succeeded by: Naïade

History

France
- Name: Iphigénie
- Laid down: 23 August 1877
- Launched: 8 September 1881
- Commissioned: 15 May 1883
- Decommissioned: 16 August 1900
- Stricken: 4 December 1901
- Fate: Sold, 19 January 1905

General characteristics
- Type: Unprotected cruiser
- Displacement: 3,399.9 t (3,346.2 long tons)
- Length: 74.53 m (244 ft 6 in) loa
- Beam: 14.2 m (46 ft 7 in)
- Draft: 6.44 m (21 ft 2 in)
- Installed power: 8 × fire-tube boilers; 2,240 ihp (1,670 kW)
- Propulsion: 1 × compound steam engine; 1 × screw propeller
- Sail plan: Full ship rig
- Speed: 13.35 knots (24.72 km/h; 15.36 mph)
- Range: 5,200 nmi (9,600 km; 6,000 mi) at 10 knots (19 km/h; 12 mph)
- Complement: 500
- Armament: 2 × 164.7 mm (6.48 in) guns; 18 × 138.6 mm (5.46 in) guns; 10 × 37 mm (1.5 in) Hotchkiss revolver cannon

Iphigénie was an unprotected cruiser of the French Navy built in the late 1870s and early 1880s. The ship was originally intended to serve overseas in the French colonial empire, but shortly after she was completed, the navy decided to convert her into a dedicated training ship. Her original armament of twenty medium-caliber guns was reduced to eight guns to free up space for accommodations. She spent her entire career, from 1884 to 1900, as a training vessel and she embarked on a total of eighteen significant training cruises. Her career passed relatively uneventfully, apart from a couple of minor accidents in the late 1880s. Having been replaced by a newer vessel in 1900, Iphigénie was decommissioned in August that year and was struck from the naval register in December 1901. She was eventually sold for scrap in 1905.

== Design ==
In the aftermath of the French defeat in the Franco-Prussian War of 1870–1871, the French Navy was forced to drastically reduce naval spending and consolidate its forces. The Navy adopted a new construction plan in 1872, which envisioned a fleet for operations in home waters and one to patrol overseas to protect French interests abroad. The squadrons that were to support the French colonial empire were to consist of a small number of second class ironclad warships supported by a large number of wooden cruising vessels.

The Minister of the Navy, Léon Martin Fourichon, requested designs for a new cruiser from French shipyards on 2 February 1877 for service with the overseas fleet. His specifications required a vessel of about 3,000 metric tons (2,950 long tons; 3,310 short tons), a top speed of at least 12 knots (22 km/h; 14 mph) under steam, a wooden hull, a broadside battery covered by the upper deck, and accommodations for an admiral and his staff. The ship was to cruise primarily using its sails, which would give the crew the experience that Fourichon saw as necessary to be proper seamen. Fourichon requested the armament consist of eight or ten 164.7 mm (6.48 in) guns in the battery and two or three 194 mm (7.6 in) guns on the upper deck. He suggested using the frigate Flore as a model, albeit enlarged.

By the time three shipyards responded, Fourichon had been replaced by Albert Gicquel des Touches, who maintained his predecessor's construction plans. The Conseil des Travaux (Council of Works) argued that the designs would be of insufficient combat power compared to cruisers being built abroad. Regardless, Gicquel des Touches decided to proceed with construction of two vessels: one of the proposals, which became Iphigénie, was designed by Piere Gaston Hermann Valin; a second vessel became Naïade. Valin's design reduced the battery from Fourichon's specification to four 164.7 mm guns on the upper deck and twelve 138.6 mm (5.46 in) guns in the battery. During construction in 1880, the number of battery guns was reduced to ten.

=== Characteristics ===
Iphigénie was 74.53 m (244 ft 6 in) long at the waterline and 73.2 m (240 ft 2 in) long between perpendiculars, with a beam of 14.2 m (46 ft 7 in) and an average draft of 6.44 m (21 ft 2 in). She displaced 3,399.9 t (3,346.2 long tons). Her hull was constructed with wood; she had a clipper bow and an overhanging stern. She had a forecastle and sterncastle. The ship had no armor protection. Her crew consisted of 500 officers and enlisted men.

The ship was propelled by a single horizontal, 3-cylinder compound steam engine that drove a screw propeller. Steam was provided by eight coal-burning fire-tube boilers that were ducted into a single funnel located amidships. The power plant was rated to produce 2,240 indicated horsepower (1,670 kW), but during her initial speed testing, they reached 2,467 ihp (1,840 kW) for a top speed of 13.35 knots (24.72 km/h; 15.36 mph). The ship carried 435 t (428 long tons) of coal, and at a cruising speed of 10 knots (19 km/h; 12 mph), Iphigénie could steam for 5,200 nautical miles (9,600 km; 6,000 mi). To supplement her steam engines, she was fitted with a three-masted full ship rig.

As originally built, the ship was armed with a main battery of two 164.7 mm (6.48 in) M1870 21-caliber (cal.) guns; they were placed in embrasures in the bow as chase guns. These were supported by a secondary battery of eighteen 138.6 mm (5.46 in) M1870 21.3-cal. guns. Of these, twelve were in a broadside battery, six guns per side. Four more were placed on the upper deck amidships, two guns per side. And the remaining pair of guns were placed on the sterncastle as stern-chasers. For close-range defense against torpedo boats, she carried ten 37 mm (1.5 in) Hotchkiss revolver cannon.

=== Modifications ===
The ship's armament underwent several alterations over the course of her career. Her conversion to a dedicated school ship in 1884 saw most of her guns removed, leaving a main battery of just eight 138.6 mm guns all on the upper deck. The forecastle guns were replaced with 100 mm (3.9 in) M1875 26.5-caliber guns. Her 37 mm Hotchkiss guns remained, and a pair of 65 mm (2.6 in) field guns were added, which could be taken ashore by a landing party. In 1886, her armament was reduced again, to six 138.6 mm guns, the two 100 mm chase guns, eight 37 mm guns, and the two 65 mm landing guns. She underwent another minor refit in 1890, during which the chase guns were replaced with an improved M1881 version of the same caliber, and two of the revolver cannon were replaced with 37 mm M1885 quick-firing guns. A single 356 mm (14 in) torpedo tube was placed in the original broadside battery space. A final refit in 1896 involved removing another pair of 138.6 mm guns, leaving just four guns of that caliber. Her other armament remained unchanged.

== Service history ==
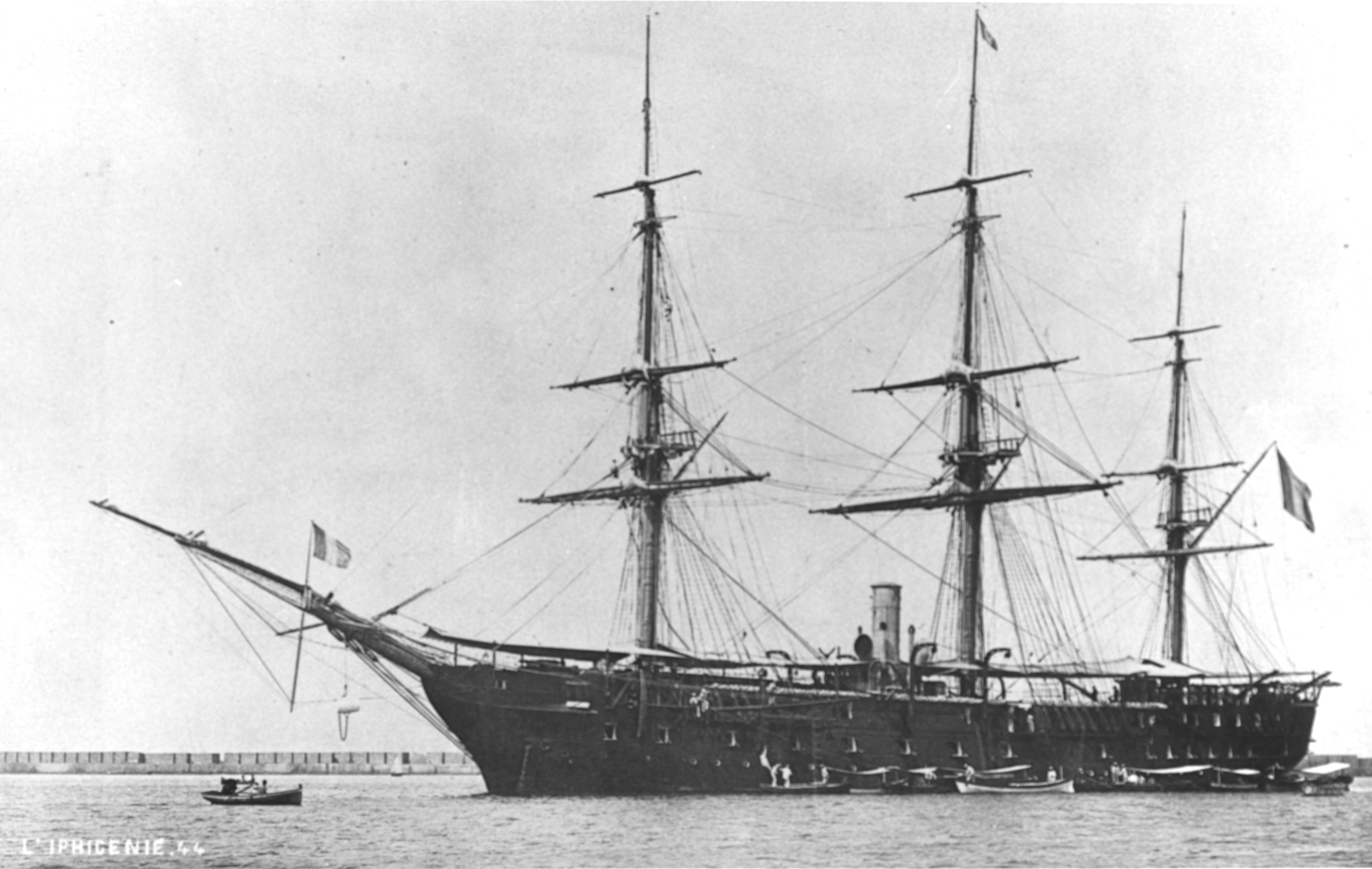
Iphigénie probably at Algiers in the mid-1880s

The keel for Iphigénie was laid down on 23 August 1877 at the Arsenal de Brest, and her completed hull was launched on 8 September 1881. Installation of the ship's propulsion machinery was delayed by more than a year while Naïade completed her initial testing. The two ships were fitted with similar propulsion systems, and the navy wanted to evaluate the machinery before proceeding with Iphigénie's construction. She was commissioned to begin sea trials on 15 May 1883, which included full power tests on 29 January 1884. She was completed the following month. While she was still undergoing trials, the decision was made on 16 October 1883 to convert Iphigénie to a dedicated training ship, and so following the end of trials on 27 February 1884, she was placed in the 3rd category of reserve to be converted. Her armament was significantly reduced. The ship was finally placed in full commission for active service on 16 August. Upon entering service, the ship was found to be cramped and the ship lacked sufficient sanitation facilities for lengthy voyages at sea. She nevertheless made eighteen major training cruises over the next sixteen years of active service. During this period, the ship trained men in a ten-month course that included education in navigation, gunnery, general seamanship, and operation of steam engines.

While in Toulon on 3 March 1887, the ship caught fire and had to be partially flooded in a dry dock to put out the blaze. Repairs began thereafter and concluded on 5 May. In October 1888, a gun exploded aboard the ship, a result of the gun crew failing to lock the breech before firing it. Iphigénie was refitted again in 1896, which included further alterations to her armament, along with modifications that improved living conditions aboard the ship. In January 1897, Iphigénie was re-rated as a third class cruiser. She was replaced as the fleet's training ship in mid-1900, having been replaced by the new vessel Duguay-Trouin. Iphigénie was decommissioned on 14 August, but she remained in the navy's inventory for more than a year before being struck from the naval register on 4 December 1901. Some thought was given to giving the ship to the civilian École professionnelle de Bordeaux, but the plan came to nothing and she was instead placed for sale on 20 August 1904 and sold for scrap on 19 January 1905.
