= HMS Iphigenia =

Four ships of the Royal Navy have borne the name HMS Iphigenia, after Iphigenia, a figure in Greek mythology:

- HMS Iphigenia (1780) was a 32-gun fifth rate launched in 1780 and burnt by accident in 1801. (Note: Ipigenia was armed en flute and was serving as a transport. She had been to Cyprus to fetch water and timber but shortly after her return to Alexandria she was discovered to be on fire. The amount of wood on her made it impossible to put the fire out. There were no casualties. Because Iphigenia served in the navy's Egyptian campaign (8 March to 8 September 1801), her officers and crew qualified for the clasp "Egypt" to the Naval General Service Medal, which the Admiralty issued in 1847 to all surviving claimants.)
- HMS Iphigenia (1804) was a 38-gun fifth rate, formerly the Spanish ship Medea. She was captured in 1804 and renamed HMS Imperieuse in 1805. She was placed on harbour service in 1818 and was sold in 1838.
- HMS Iphigenia (1808) was a 36-gun fifth rate launched in 1808. She was lent to the Marine Society between 1833 and 1848, and was broken up in 1851.
- HMS Iphigenia (1891) was an Apollo-class protected cruiser launched in 1891, converted to a minelayer in 1910 and sunk as a blockship in the Zeebrugge Raid in 1918.

== See also ==
- French ship Iphigénie
