= Aftercastle =

Structure behind mizzenmast on sailing ships

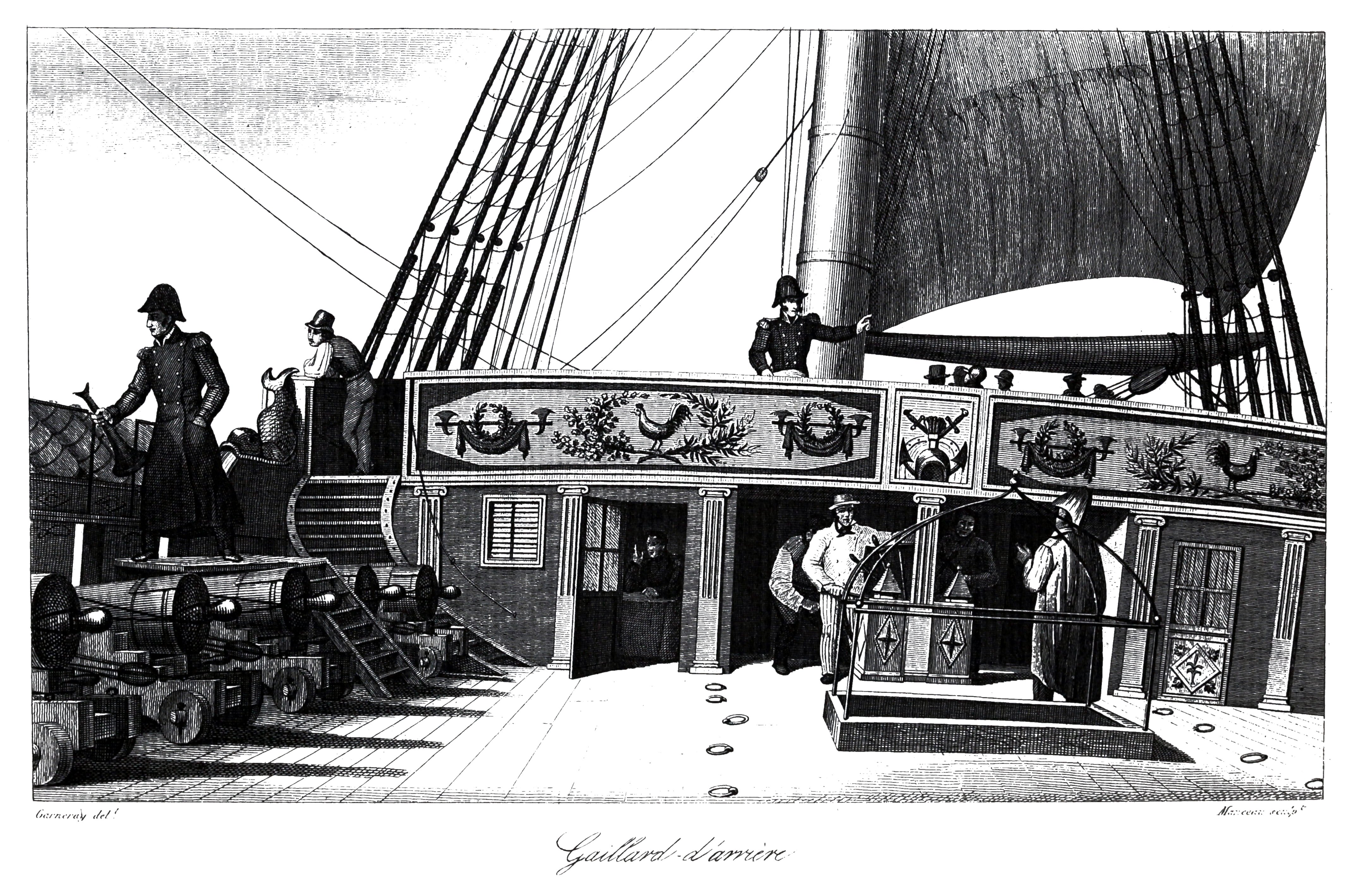
Aftercastle of the frigate Méduse, as seen from the deck

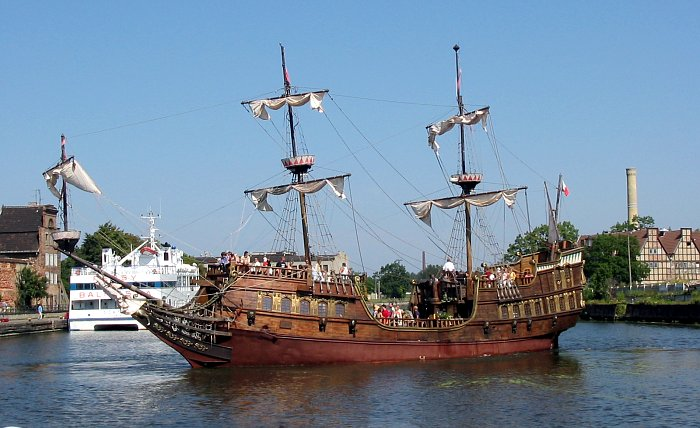
Galleon showing both a forecastle (left) and aftercastle (right)

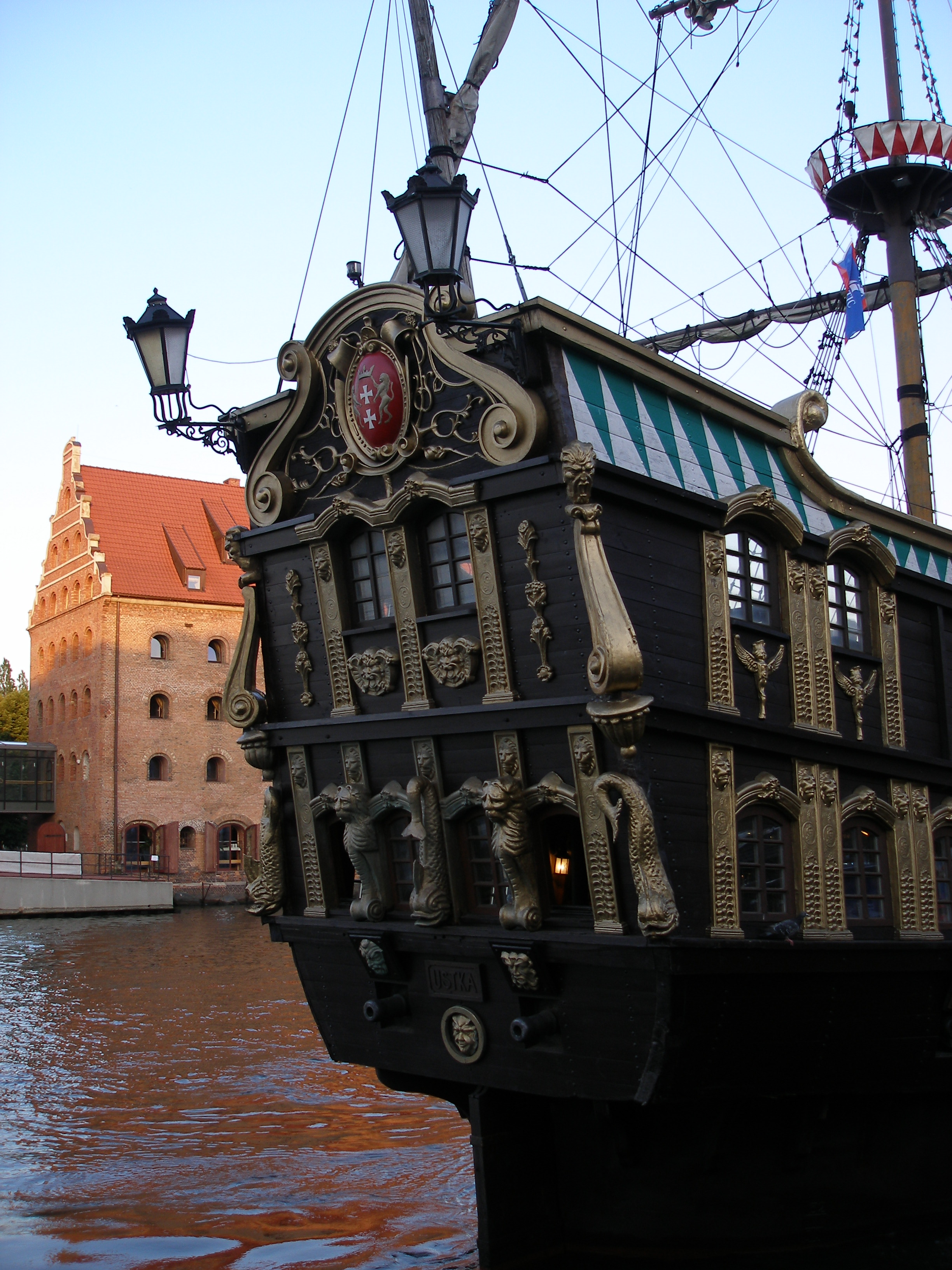
Stern of a replica 17th-century galleon

The aftercastle (UK: /ˈɑːftəˌkɑːsəl/, US: /ˈæftərˌkæsəl/; or sterncastle, sometimes aftcastle) is the stern structure behind the mizzenmast and above the transom on large sailing ships, such as carracks, caravels, galleons and galleasses. It usually houses the captain's cabin and perhaps additional cabins and is crowned by the poop deck, which on men-of-war provided a heightened platform from which to fire upon other ships; it was also a place of defence in the event of boarding. More common, but much smaller, is the forecastle.

The corresponding term forecastle today is also used to describe the upper deck of a sailing ship forward of the foremast in general.

As sailing ships evolved, the aftercastle gave way to the quarterdeck, whose span ran all the way to the main mast.
