= List of cruisers of France =

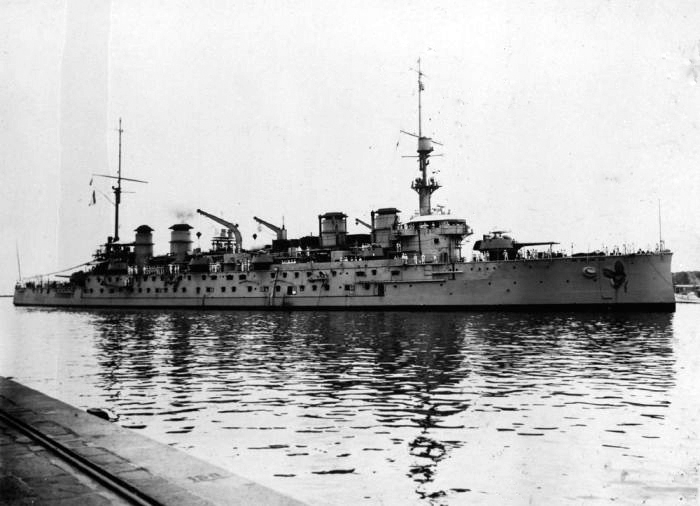
French armoured cruiser Jules Michelet, carrying the Governor-General of French Indochina, mooring in the harbor of Tanjung Priok, Batavia, April 1929

== Unprotected cruisers ==
- Talisman (1862)
- Limier class
  - Limier (1866)
  - Hamelin (1866)
  - Volta (1867)
  - L'Hermitte (1867)
  - D'Estrées (1867)
- Desaix (1866)
- Châteaurenault (1868)
- Linois (1867)
- Infernet class
  - Infernet (1869)
  - Dupetit-Thouars (1874)
  - Champlain (1872)
  - La Clocheterie (1872)
- Sané class
  - Sané (1869)
  - Seignelay (1874)
  - Fabert (1874)
- Bourayne class
  - Bourayne (1869)
  - Segond (1869)
  - Dayot (1869)
  - Ducouëdic (1869)
  - Kersaint (1869)
  - Vaudreuil (1870)
  - Hugon (1872)
  - Beautemps-Beaupré (1872)
  - Duchaffault (1872)
  - Kerguélen (1872)
- Hirondelle (1869)
- Rigault de Genouilly class
  - Rigault de Genouilly (1876)
  - Éclaireur (1877)

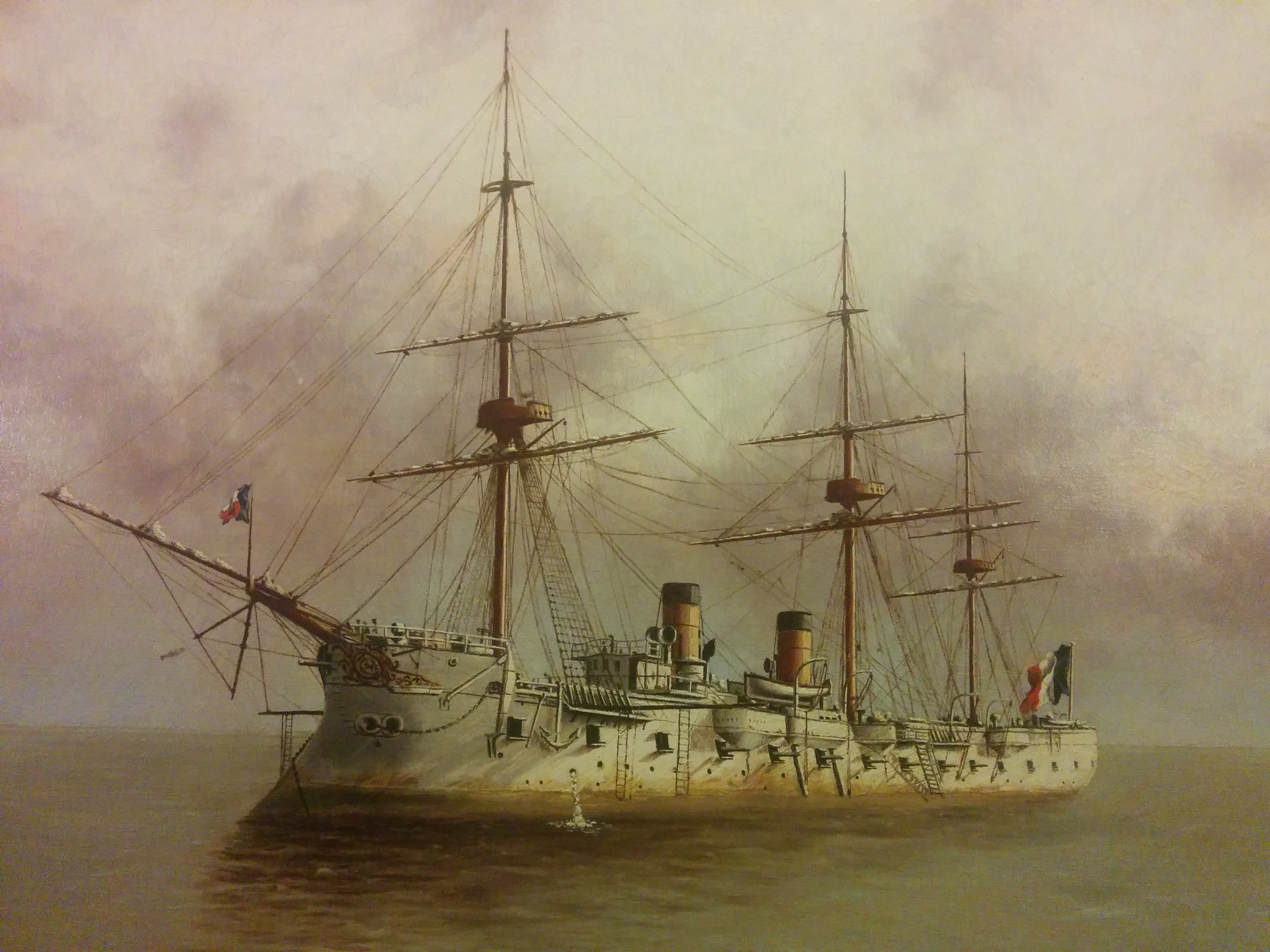
Painting of Duquesne

- Duquesne class
  - Duquesne (1876) – struck 1901
  - Tourville (1876) – struck 1901
- Duguay-Trouin (1877)
- Lapérouse class
  - Lapérouse (1877) – wrecked 1898
  - D'Estaing (1879)
  - Nielly (1880)
  - Primauguet (1882)
- Villars class
  - Villars (1879)
  - Forfait (1879)
  - Magon (1880)
  - Roland (1882)
- Iphigénie (1881) - struck 1901
- Naïade (1881)
- Aréthuse (1882)
- Dubourdieu (1884)
- Milan (1885)

== Torpedo cruisers ==
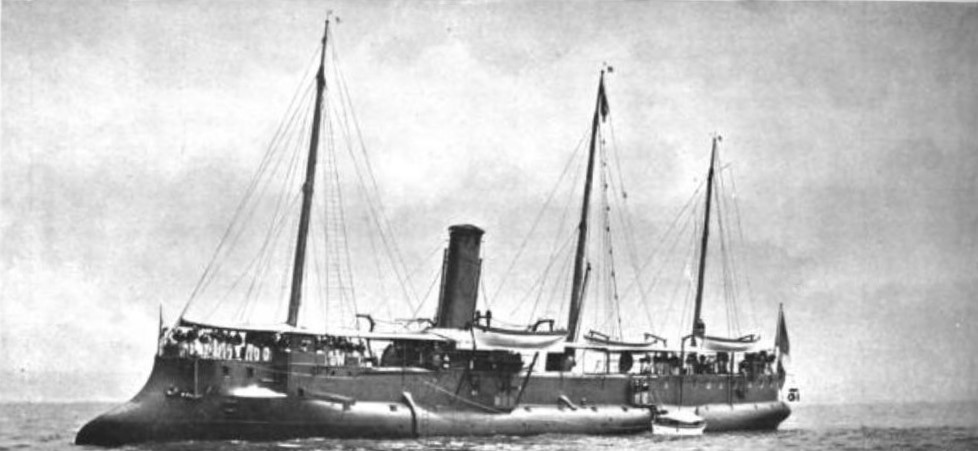
Wattignies in the mid-1890s

- Condor class
  - Condor (1885)
  - Epervier (1886)
  - Faucon (1887)
  - Vautour (1889)
- Wattignies class
  - Wattignies (1891)
  - Fleurus (1893)
- D'Iberville class
  - D'Iberville (1892)
  - Cassini (1894)
  - Casabianca (1895)

== Protected cruisers ==
Sfax, the first French protected cruiser, early in her career

- Sfax (1884) – struck 1906
- Tage (1886) – struck 1910
- Amiral Cécille (1888) – scrapped 1919
- Davout (1889) – struck 1910
- Suchet (1893) – struck 1906
- Forbin class
  - Forbin (1888) – scrapped 1921
  - Coëtlogon (1888) – struck 1906
  - Surcouf (1888) – struck 1921
- Troude class
  - Troude (1888) – struck 1908
  - Cosmao (1889) - struck 1922
  - Lalande (1889) - struck 1912
- Jean Bart class
  - Jean Bart (1889) – sunk 1907
  - Isly (1891) – struck 1914
- Alger (1889) – hulked 1911
- Friant class
  - Friant (1893) – struck 1920
  - Chasseloup-Laubat (1893)
  - Bugeaud (1893) – struck 1907
- Linois class
  - Linois (1894) - struck 1910
  - Galilée (1896) - struck 1911
  - Lavoisier (1897) – struck 1920
- Descartes class
  - Descartes (1894) – struck 1920
  - Pascal (1895) - struck 1911
- D'Assas class
  - D'Assas (1896) - struck 1914
  - Du Chayla (1895) - struck 1921
  - Cassard (1896) – struck 1924

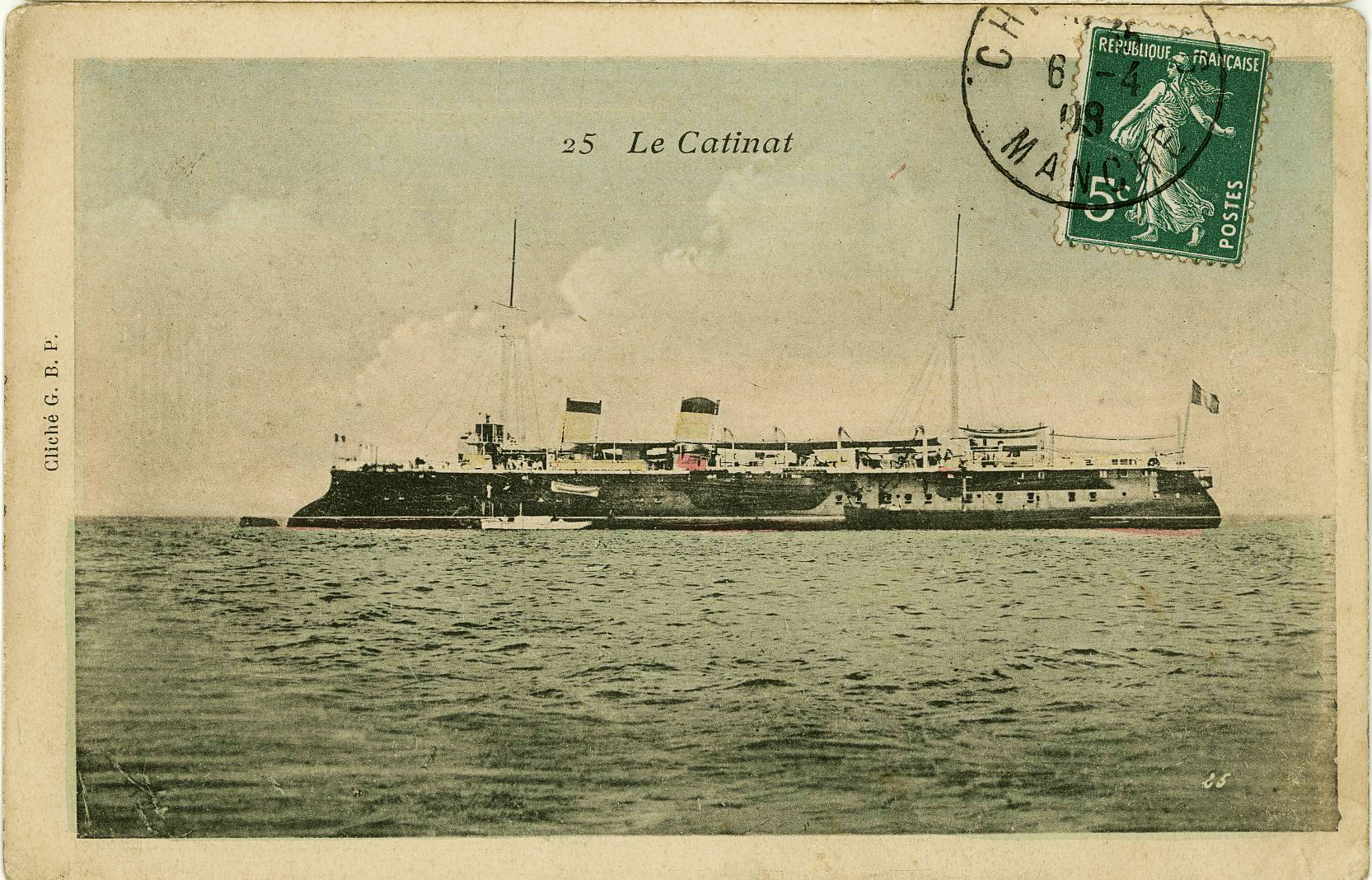
Catinat, protected cruiser, 1896-1911

- Catinat class
  - Catinat (1896) - struck 1911
  - Protet (1898) - struck 1910
- D'Entrecasteaux (1896) - sold to Poland 1927; struck 1942
- Guichen (1897) – struck 1922
- Châteaurenault (1898) – sunk 1917
- D'Estrées class
  - D'Estrées (1897) – struck 1922
  - Infernet (1899) – ran aground 1910
- Jurien de la Gravière (1899) – struck 1922

== Armoured cruisers ==
- Dupuy de Lôme (1890)
- Amiral Charner class
  - Amiral Charner (1893) – sunk by torpedo 1916
  - Bruix (1894) – scrapped in 1920
  - Chanzy (1894) – wrecked 1907
  - Latouche-Tréville (1892) – scrapped 1926
- Pothuau (1895) – scrapped 1929
- Jeanne d'Arc (1899) – scrapped 1934
- Gueydon class
  - Gueydon (1899) – sunk 1944
  - Montcalm (1900) – scrapped 1943
  - Dupetit-Thouars (1901) – sunk by torpedo 1918
- Dupleix class
  - Dupleix (1900) – scrapped 1922
  - Desaix (1901) – scrapped 1927
  - Kléber (1902) – sunk by mine 1917

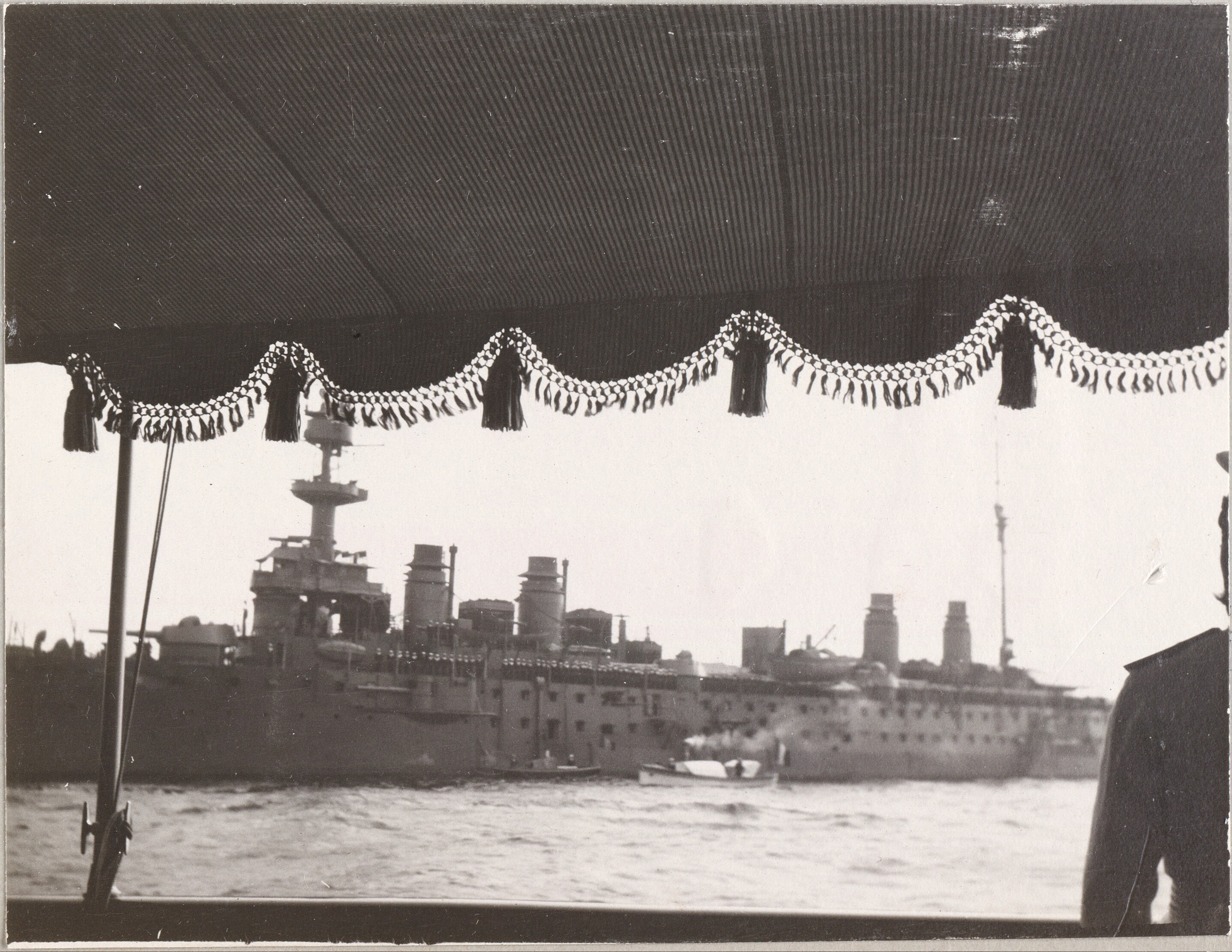
Gloire-class cruiser seen from the Russian yacht Standart, circa 1912-13

- Gloire class
  - Gloire (1900)
  - Marseillaise (1900)
  - Sully (1901) – sunk 1905
  - Condé (1902)
  - Amiral Aube (1902)
- Léon Gambetta class
  - Léon Gambetta (1901) – torpedoed 1915
  - Jules Ferry (1903) – struck 1927
  - Victor Hugo (1904) – scrapped 1930
- Jules Michelet (1905)
- Ernest Renan (1906) – struck 1931

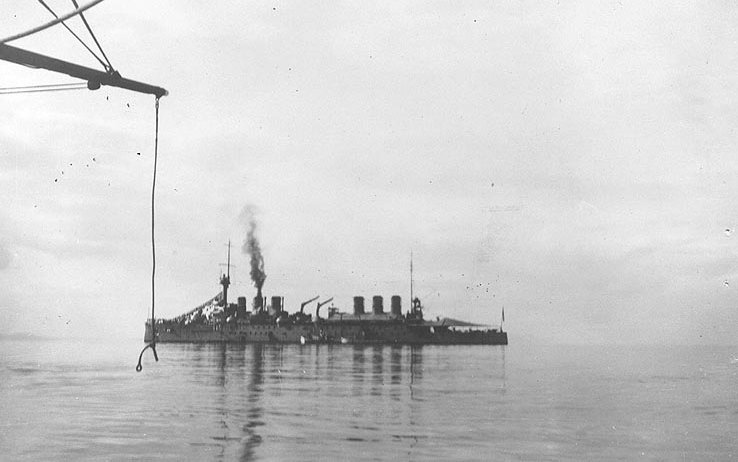
Waldeck-Rousseau

- Edgar Quinet class
  - Edgar Quinet (1907) – struck 1930
  - Waldeck-Rousseau (1908) – destroyed 1943

== Light cruisers ==
- La Motte-Picquet class (1912) – (ten planned but not ordered)
- Mulhouse (1920) – struck 1933
- Metz (1920)
- Colmar (1920)
- Strasbourg (1920)
- Thionville (1920)
- Duguay-Trouin class
  - Duguay-Trouin (1923) – scrapped 1952
  - La Motte-Picquet (1924) – sunk 12 January 1945
  - Primauguet (1924) – burnt out after Naval Battle of Casablanca, 8 November 1942.
- Jeanne d'Arc (1930) – scrapped 1966
- Émile Bertin (1933) – struck 1959
- La Galissonnière class
  - La Galissonnière (1933) – scuttled 27 November 1942, salvaged by Italian Navy in 1943 as FR 12, sunk by bombing 18 August 1944.
  - Jean de Vienne (1935)– scuttled 27 November 1942, salvaged by Italian Navy in 1943 as FR 11, wrecked by bombing 24 November 1943.
  - Marseillaise (1935) – scuttled 27 November 1942.
  - Gloire (1935) – scrapped 1958
  - Montcalm (1933) – hulked 1958 and scrapped 1970
  - Georges Leygues (1936) – scrapped 1959
- De Grasse class
  - De Grasse (1946) – scrapped 1976
  - Châteaurenault - cancelled 1939
  - Guichen - cancelled 1939
- Châteaurenault (1948) – scrapped 1979
- Guichen (1948) – scrapped 1982
- Colbert (1956) – scrapped 2016

== Heavy cruisers ==
- Duquesne class
  - Duquesne (1925) – scrapped 1955
  - Tourville (1926) – scrapped 1962
- Suffren class
  - Suffren (1927) – scrapped 1974
  - Colbert (1928) – scuttled 1942
  - Foch (1929) – scuttled 1942, scrapped 1943
  - Dupleix (1930) – scuttled 1942
- Algérie (1932) – scuttled 1942
- Saint-Louis class (1939) – (six planned but not ordered)
  - Saint-Louis
  - Henri IV
  - Charlemagne
  - Brennus
  - Charles Martel
  - Vercingetorix

== Helicopter cruisers ==
- Jeanne d'Arc (1961) – decommissioned 2010

== Notes and references ==
- Jordan, John; Moulin, Jean (2013). French Cruisers 1922 – 1956. Barnsley, UK: Seaforth Publishing. ISBN 978-1-84832-133-5.
- Whitley, M. J. (1999). Cruisers of World War Two: An International Encyclopedia. London: Brockhampton Press. ISBN 1-86019-8740.
