= Rigault de Genouilly =

Rigault de Genouilly may refer to:

- Charles Rigault de Genouilly (1807–1873), French admiral
- The Rigault de Genouilly-class cruisers, a pair of cruisers of the French Navy built in the 1870s
  - French cruiser Rigault de Genouilly, the lead ship of the Rigault de Genouilly class
- French aviso Rigault de Genouilly, a French Navy aviso commissioned in 1932 and sunk in 1940
