= French cruiser Coëtlogon =

Protected cruiser of the French Navy

- Coëtlogon at anchor

History

France
- Name: Coëtlogon
- Ordered: 23 May 1887
- Builder: Ateliers et Chantiers de Saint-Nazaire Penhoët
- Laid down: 27 May 1887
- Launched: 3 December 1888
- Completed: 20 September 1894
- Commissioned: 20 March 1890
- Decommissioned: 1 June 1905
- In service: 20 September 1894
- Out of service: 20 August 1896
- Stricken: 26 August 1905
- Fate: Broken up, 1906

General characteristics
- Class & type: Forbin-class cruiser
- Displacement: 1,857 t (1,828 long tons; 2,047 short tons)
- Length: 96.1 m (315 ft 3 in) loa
- Beam: 9.33 m (30 ft 7 in)
- Draft: 4.5 m (14 ft 9 in)
- Installed power: 6 × fire-tube boilers; 6,200 ihp (4,600 kW)
- Propulsion: 2 × compound steam engines; 2 × screw propellers
- Sail plan: Schooner rig
- Speed: 20 knots (37 km/h; 23 mph)
- Range: 2,400 nmi (4,400 km; 2,800 mi) at 10 knots (19 km/h; 12 mph)
- Complement: 209
- Armament: 4 × 138.6 mm (5.46 in) guns; 3 × 47 mm (1.9 in) guns; 4 × 37 mm (1.5 in) Hotchkiss revolver cannon; 4 × 356 mm (14 in) torpedo tubes
- Armor: Deck: 40 mm (1.6 in)

Coëtlogon was a protected cruiser of the Forbin class built in the late 1880s and early 1890s for the French Navy; she was the last member of her class to be built. The Forbin-class cruisers were built as part of a construction program intended to provide scouts for the main battle fleet. They were based on the earlier unprotected cruiser Milan, with the addition of an armor deck to improve their usefulness in battle. They had a high top speed for the time, at around 20 knots (37 km/h; 23 mph), and they carried a main battery of four 138 mm (5.4 in) guns.

Coëtlogon saw little activity, in part because problems with her propulsion system delayed her completion by three years; after a serious breakdown while on sea trials in 1891, the entire system had to be replaced. Even then, her propulsion system proved to be problematic, including excessive vibration. She was finally completed in 1894 and was assigned to the Northern Squadron, though she only served in the unit for two years. She saw no further active service, and she was struck from the naval register in 1905, briefly used as a munitions storage hulk, before being broken up in 1906.

== Design ==
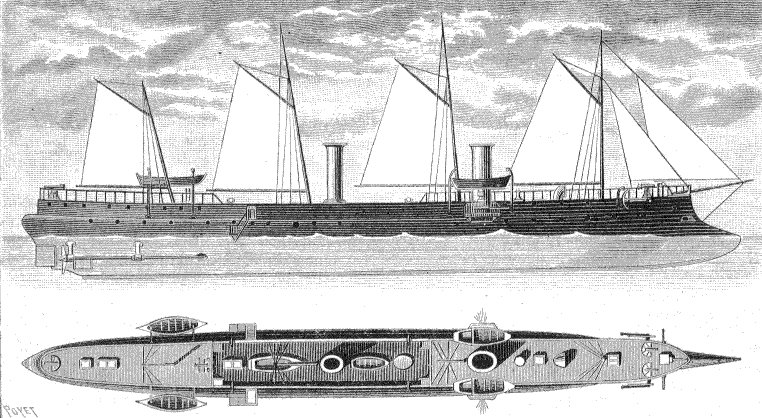
Profile drawing of an early version of the Forbin design, depicting the original four-masted rig used aboard Forbin

Beginning in 1879, the French Navy's Conseil des Travaux (Council of Works) had requested designs for small but fast cruisers of about 2,000 long tons (2,032 t) displacement that could be used as scouts for the main battle fleet. The unprotected cruiser Milan was the first of the type, which was developed into the Forbin-type of protected cruisers after the Conseil requested light armor protection for the ships. The three Forbins, along with the three very similar Troude-class cruisers, were ordered by Admiral Théophile Aube, then the French Minister of Marine and an ardent supporter of the Jeune École doctrine. Aube intended to use the new cruisers as commerce raiders, rather than fleet scouts.

Coëtlogon was 95 m (311 ft 8 in) long at the waterline and 96.1 m (315 ft 3 in) long overall, with a beam of 9.33 m (30 ft 7 in) and an average draft of 4.5 m (14 ft 9 in). She displaced 1,857 t (1,828 long tons; 2,047 short tons). Her crew amounted to 209 officers and enlisted men. The ship's propulsion system consisted of a pair of compound steam engines driving two screw propellers. Steam was provided by six coal-burning fire-tube boilers that were ducted into two funnels. Her machinery was rated to produce 6,200 indicated horsepower (4,600 kW) for a top speed of 20 knots (37 km/h; 23 mph). She had a cruising radius of 2,395 nautical miles (4,436 km; 2,756 mi) at a speed of 10 knots (19 km/h; 12 mph).

The ship was armed with a main battery of four 138.6 mm (5.46 in) 30-caliber guns in individual pivot mounts, all in sponsons with two guns per broadside. For close-range defense against torpedo boats, she carried three 47 mm (1.9 in) 3-pounder Hotchkiss guns and four 37 mm (1.5 in) 1-pounder Hotchkiss revolver cannon. She was also armed with four 356 mm (14 in) torpedo tubes in her hull above the waterline, two forward and two further aft. She had provisions to carry up to 150 naval mines. Armor protection consisted of an armor deck that was 40 mm (1.6 in) thick and sloped downward at the sides to provide a measure of vertical protection. Above the deck, a highly subdivided layer of watertight compartments was intended to control flooding. A thin anti-splinter deck below the armor deck covered the machinery spaces.

=== Modifications ===
The initial design for the Forbin class called for a four-masted sailing rig and a main battery of just two 138.6 mm guns, but during construction their specifications were revised; a second pair of guns was added to strengthen their combat power relative to foreign counterparts. And during trials with Forbin, the original rigging proved to be of little use and the navy decided to replace it with the schooner rig. The armament changes were carried out for Coëtlogon between September 1889 and February 1890, before she began her initial testing, but the rigging was not altered until October 1892, when her propulsion system was being replaced. In 1892–1893, the ship underwent a refit. Her rigging was further reduced by the removal of her main mast and the bowsprit, though the fore and mizzenmasts were moved closer together. The main battery was converted to quick firing, and the light armament now consisted of five 47 mm guns, three 37 mm guns, and four 37 mm revolver cannon.

== Service history ==
Coëtlogon, date unknown

The third member of the Forbin class was ordered on 23 May 1887. Work began on Coëtlogon with her keel laying at the Ateliers et Chantiers de Saint-Nazaire Penhoët shipyard on four days later. She was launched on 3 December 1888 and was commissioned for sea trials on 20 March 1890, which were conducted off Brest. Her propulsion system failed and had to be completely replaced. On 18 January 1892, the ship was placed in the 3rd category of reserve, and on 5 March, she was towed back to Saint-Nazaire to have the new engines installed. The work was completed by mid-1893, and she began another round of trials on 17 August 1893. Trials conducted in March 1894 had to be stopped due to excessive friction in the engines, which caused so much vibration in the hull that the ship's compasses were not usable. She ran acceptable trials in June, where she reached a top speed of 20.4 knots (37.8 km/h; 23.5 mph) using forced draft, though was not ready for service until August. She completed her initial sea trials in 1894; during the testing, she reached a maximum average speed of 20.6 knots (38.2 km/h; 23.7 mph). She was accepted by the navy on 31 August and was placed in full commission on 20 September.

The same day she was placed in active service, Coëtlogon was assigned to the Northern Squadron. The unit was kept in commission for only four months per year. The unit at that time consisted of the coastal defense ship Furieux, the ironclads Requin, Victorieuse, and Suffren, the armored cruiser Latouche-Tréville, and the protected cruisers Jean Bart and Surcouf. Coëtlogon took part in the annual fleet maneuvers that began on 1 July 1895. The exercises took place in two phases, the first being a simulated amphibious assault in Quiberon Bay, and the second revolving around a blockade of Rochefort and Cherbourg. The maneuvers concluded on the afternoon of 23 July.

She remained in the unit in 1896. She took part in the maneuvers that year, which were conducted from 6 to 26 July in conjunction with the local defense forces of Brest, Rochefort, Cherbourg, and Lorient. The squadron was divided into three divisions for the maneuvers, and Coëtlogon was assigned to the 3rd Division along with the coastal defense ship Bouvines and the armored cruiser Dupuy de Lôme, which represented the enemy squadron. She was taken out of service on 20 August and placed in reserve at Lorient, but remained in commission. The ship had proved to be problematic in service, and the new propulsion system still had not corrected her deficiencies; the maritime prefect that oversaw the reserve ships at Lorient stated in a message to the naval minister on 15 January 1905 that "this cruiser has always given rise to problems and it would be imprudent to rely on her now." As a result, she was decommissioned on 1 June and struck from the naval register on 26 August. The ship was thereafter employed as an ammunition storage hulk at Lorient until being placed for sale on 9 April 1906. She was purchased on 11 August by M. Guilhaumon and thereafter scrapped.
