= Saint-Louis-class cruiser =

1930s French heavy cruiser design

Class overview
- Name: Saint-Louis class
- Operators: French Navy
- Preceded by: Algérie
- Succeeded by: None
- Planned: 6
- Completed: 0

The French Navy (Marine Nationale) created a series of heavy cruiser designs in 1939 to follow the Algérie but free of the limitations imposed on warship construction by the London Naval Treaty and Washington Naval Treaty. This series was designated C5. At the outbreak of the Second World War, all ships under construction that could not be finished in the short term were suspended, and their designs reviewed. The C5 design was modified and updated, and tentatively to be named the Saint-Louis class. All further design work on the Saint-Louis class ended with the fall of France in 1940.

== C5 A3 and C5 SA1 ==
General characteristics
- Type: Heavy cruiser
- Displacement: C5 A3: 10,246 t (10,084 long tons; 11,294 short tons), C5 SA1: 10,349 t (10,186 long tons; 11,408 short tons),
- Length: 185 m (607.0 ft)
- Beam: 21.8 m (72 ft)
- Draft: 5.55 m (18.2 ft)
- Propulsion: 2-shaft geared steam turbines, 4 Indret boilers; 100,000 shp (75,000 kW)
- Speed: 32.5 knots (37.4 mph; 60.2 km/h)
- Armament: C5 A3: 9 × 203 mm (8.0 in)/55 guns (3 × 3); 10 × 100 mm (3.9 in)/45 Modèle 1933 (5 × 2); 8 × 37 mm (1.5 in)/70 Modèle 1935 (4 × 2); 6 × 550 mm (22 in) torpedo tubes (2 × 3), C5 SA1: 9 × 203 mm (8.0 in)/55 guns (3 × 3); 14 × 100 mm (3.9 in)/45 Modèle 1933 (7 × 2); 12 × 37 mm (1.5 in)/70 Modèle 1935 (6 × 2); 16 × 13.2 mm (0.52 in)/76 machine guns (4 × 4); 6 × 550 mm (22 in) torpedo tubes (2 × 3),
- Armor: Belt: 100 mm (3.94 in); Upper armored deck: 80 mm (3.1 in); Lower armored deck: 38 mm (1.5 in); Main turrets: 50–100 mm (2.0–3.9 in)
- Aircraft carried: C5 A3: 2 Loire 130 seaplanes, two catapults; C5 SA1: None

Work on the C5 program began to eventually replace the Duguay-Trouin class light cruisers, which were due for replacement from 1946, as stipulated in the London Naval Treaty of 1930 that all cruisers over 3,000 tons could not be replaced until twenty years from their date of commission. With the typically required year of design work and four to five years to build a cruiser in France, preliminary design work began in the spring of 1939 by the STCN (Service technique des constructions navales). French Navy officials in the late 1930s, in addition to their concern over the growth of the Italian Regia Marina, were also influenced by the news of Germany laying down five (nominally) 10,000-ton heavy cruisers armed with 20.3 cm guns which further impelled the need for newer, more heavily armed cruisers. The new 1939 program was given the designation 'C5', following the French navy nomenclature for cruisers since 1926 (a 'C' designation with numbers in sequence, starting with Colbert as 'C1', to Algérie as 'C4').

=== Design and development ===
Little remains of the original documentation for the C5 program but a document from 12 May 1939 listed two plans (likely) for competitive evaluation. One plan was to be called A3 for "Aviation 3", with two seaplanes. The second plan was to be called SA1 for "Sans-Aviation 1" that was proposed without naval aviation facilities. Both designs would be based on Algérie, such as a flush deck, bridge tower structure and protection. The major innovation of the C5 over the C4 was the adoption of three triple mounted 203 mm (8 in) guns., which was influenced by the De Grasse-class light cruisers. This gave the C5, not only a single gun advantage over most contemporary heavy cruiser designs, which usually had an eight gun 4 × 2 gun configuration, but also reduced the necessary centreline length required by eliminating one turret. This allowed for additional anti-aircraft guns (in the case of the SA1 design) or an enlarged seaplane hangar (in the case of the A3 design).

The C5 program also required the incorporation of two newly developed anti-aircraft systems, the dual-purpose Canon de 100 mm Modèle 1933, which would never see service (it was also planned for the De Grasse-class light cruisers and the Le Fier-class torpedo boats), and the advanced Canon de 37 mm Modèle 1935 ACAD (automatique contre-avions double). The ACAD was a fully automatic twin 37 mm gun system, loaded from an underground ammunition lobby beneath the fully enclosed power-trained (but not elevated) turret. Firing from six-round magazines, the guns fired high-sensitivity projectiles 825 mps at 165-172 rounds per minute with a firing pressure of 3,000 kg/cm. This high rate of fire and high pressure on the gun also meant the ACAD had a very short barrel life of approximately 600 rounds. To eliminate issues of flash and vibration in aiming experienced by on-mount sights, the guns were directed by a 2-metre rangefinger mounted a separate fire control tower which aimed and fired the gun. A single gun prototype of the ACAD was mounted on Amiens in 1939 which provided covering anti-aircraft fire for retreating British Expeditionary Force during the Battle of Dunkirk.

=== A3 and SA1 ===
The primary difference between the A3 and SA1 designs was the use of space aft of the ship's funnel. The "A3" design utilized this space for two Loire 130 and two seaplane catapults, with a lift and rest position between them. A rotating platform between the catapults also allowed the seaplanes on trolleys to be manoeuvred directly onto the catapult without the use of cranes. This was the same system on the De Grasse and Dunkerque classes. Twin fifteen-metre (49 ft) cranes were to be used to recover the seaplanes from the water.

The "SA1" plan conversely did not possess any aircraft facilities. Instead the space where the A3 design used as aircraft facilities was used for two more 37 mm ACAD turrets and two more twin 100 mm/45 positions. Absent from the A3 design, four quadruple Hotchkiss M1929 machine gun positions were located on the corners of the shelter deck, as with the Algérie. These significantly increased the SA1 anti-aircraft capabilities over the A3 design. The trade-off between the designs was an increase in internal volume needed for the additional 100 and 37 mm armoured ammunition magazines by 3.5 m and increasing the weight of the SA1 design by over 100 tons. The additional anti-aircraft guns would also require more crew and accommodations than the aviation focused A3 design.

== Saint-Louis ==
General characteristics
- Type: Heavy cruiser
- Displacement: 14,536 t (14,306 long tons; 16,023 short tons)
- Length: 202 m (662.7 ft)
- Beam: 20 m (65.6 ft)
- Draft: 5.8 m (19.0 ft)
- Propulsion: unspecified, 120,000 shp (89,000 kW)
- Speed: 33 knots (61 km/h; 38 mph)
- Range: 4,200 nautical miles (7,800 km) at 20 knots (37 km/h; 23 mph)
- Complement: 760
- Armament: 3 × triple 203 mm (8 in) guns; 6 × twin 100 mm (3.9 in) guns; 6 × twin 37 mm (1.5 in) AA guns; 2 × triple 550 mm (22 in) torpedo tubes
- Aircraft carried: 2–3 Loire 130 seaplanes
- Aviation facilities: 2 × aircraft catapults

With the outbreak of war in Europe on 1 September 1939, all ships under construction that could not be completed in the short term were suspended and were to be reviewed, including the C5 program. By 23 January, a new study for a 13,000-ton displacement heavy cruiser was authorized based on the C5. This was further elaborated in the 1 April 1940 naval decree which called for the construction of three such heavy cruisers. The general characteristics and specifications were outlined by 15 April 1940 with the maximum displacement increase even further to 14,770 tons, and by 15 May 1940. A list of names for the new heavy cruisers were drawn up based mostly on retired pre-dreadnought battleships. These names were Saint-Louis, Henri IV, Charlemagne, Brennus, Charles Martel and Vercingetorix. All work on the Saint-Louis class was scrapped after the fall of France on 25 June 1940, without a finalized armour layout (out of four different suggested plans) and without finalized details on the engines.

== See also ==
- M-class cruiser–World War II German cruiser design series, never built

== Bibliography ==
- Jordan, John & Moulin, Jean (2013). French Cruisers 1922–1956. Barnsley, UK: Seaforth Publishing. ISBN 978-1-84832-133-5.
