= 203mm/55 Modèle 1931 gun =

203mm/55 Modèle 1931
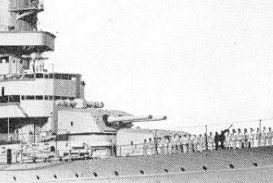
- Main guns of the Algérie
- Type: Naval gun
- Place of origin: France

Service history
- Used by: France
- Wars: Second World War

Production history
- Designed: 1931

Specifications
- Mass: 22 tonnes
- Barrel length: 11.3 metres (37 ft)
- Shell: Separate charges and shell: APC M1936: 134 kilograms (295 lb)
- Caliber: 203 millimetres (8.0 in)
- Breech: Welin Breech Block
- Rate of fire: 4-5 RPM
- Muzzle velocity: 840 metres per second (2,800 ft/s)
- Maximum firing range: 31,000 metres (34,000 yd) at 45°

The 203mm/55 Modèle 1931 gun was a medium naval gun of the French Navy. It used the same ammunition as the 203mm/50 Modèle 1924 gun, and were very similar except for the longer bore. It is believed that the guns were built from tubes of the older 240mm/50 Modèle 1902 guns.

Although commonly described as being used as the main battery of the heavy cruiser Algérie, mounted in four twin turrets, Algérie in fact used the same 203mm/50 Modèle 1924 as the rest of the French heavy cruisers.

In fact as written in French Cruisers 1922 - 1956 these guns did not exist.

== Bibliography ==
- Jordan, John & Moulin, Jean (2013). French Cruisers 1922–1956. Barnsley, UK: Seaforth Publishing. ISBN 978-1-84832-133-5.
- Whitley, M.J. (1995). Cruisers of World War Two – An International Encyclopedia. London, UK: Arms and Armour Press. ISBN 1-85409-225-1.
- McMurtrie, Francis E. (1940). Jane's Fighting Ships 1940. London, UK: Sampson Low, Marston & Company, Ltd.
