= French cruiser Éclaireur =

French naval vessel (c. 1870s)

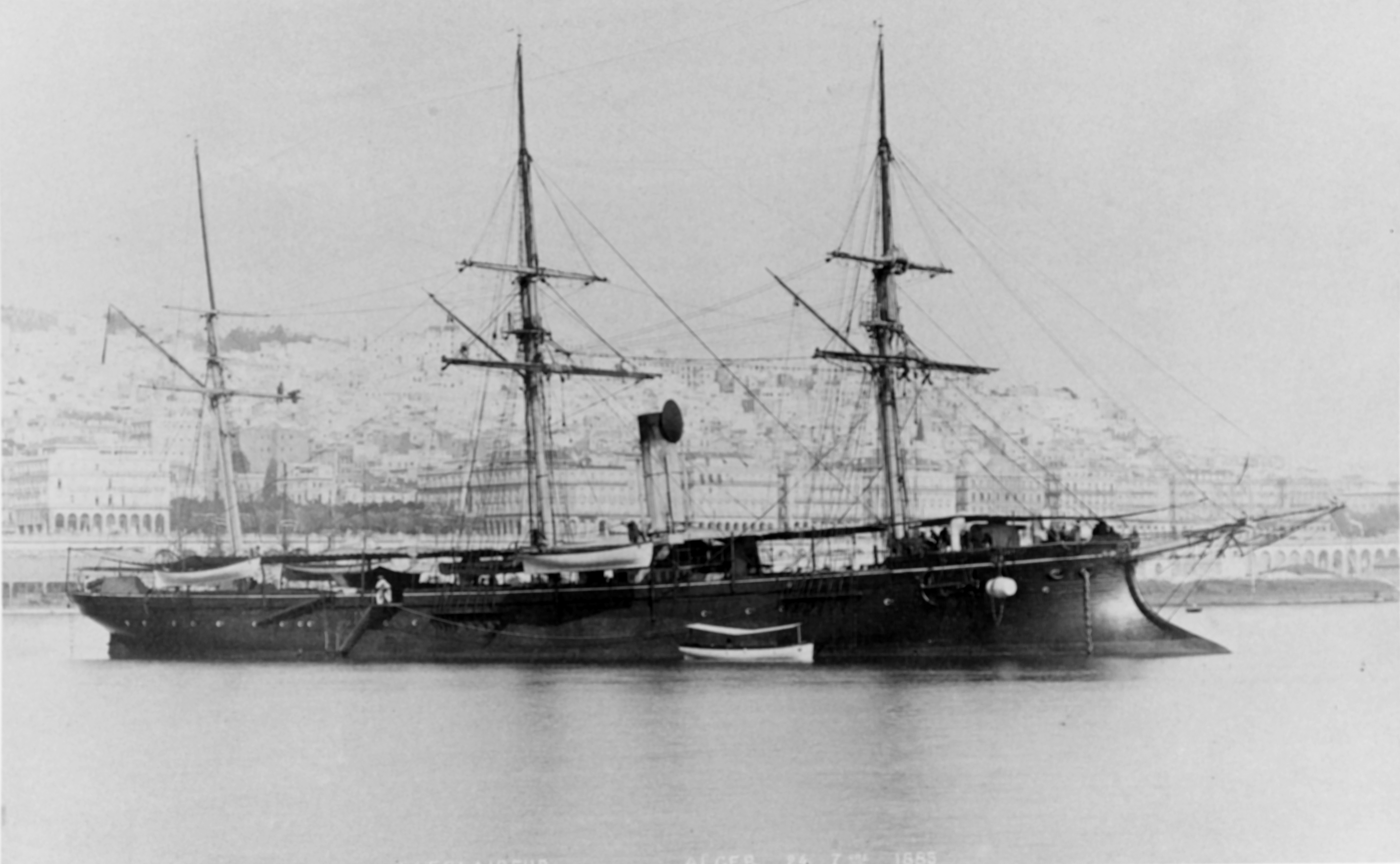
- Éclaireur

History

France
- Name: Éclaireur
- Laid down: 5 May 1874
- Launched: 30 August 1877
- Commissioned: 15 November 1878
- Stricken: 4 November 1902
- Fate: Sold for scrap, 1904

General characteristics
- Class & type: Rigault de Genouilly-class cruiser
- Displacement: 1,769 t (1,741 long tons; 1,950 short tons)
- Length: 71.9 m (235 ft 11 in) lwl
- Beam: 10.8 m (35 ft 5 in)
- Draft: 4.7 m (15 ft 5 in)
- Installed power: 6 × fire-tube boilers; 2,000 ihp (1,500 kW)
- Propulsion: 1 × compound steam engine; 1 × screw propeller
- Sail plan: Full ship rig
- Speed: 15 knots (28 km/h; 17 mph)
- Range: 3,130 nmi (5,800 km; 3,600 mi) at 10 knots (19 km/h; 12 mph)
- Complement: 195
- Armament: 8 × 138.6 mm (5.46 in) guns; 2 × 37 mm (1.5 in) Hotchkiss revolver cannon

Éclaireur was a Rigault de Genouilly-class cruiser built in the 1870s for the French Navy; she was the second and final member of the class. The ships were intended to fill multiple roles, including as scouts for the French fleet, and to patrol the French colonial empire; as such, they were given a high top speed of 15 knots (28 km/h; 17 mph) and were optimized to use their sailing rig for long voyages abroad. They were armed with a main battery of eight 138.6 mm (5.46 in) guns. Éclaireur was built between 1874 and 1878, but she was initially kept in reserve until 1881 for a deployment to patrol France's holdings in the Pacific Ocean. In 1884, she was sent to Southeast Asia to strengthen French naval forces during the Sino-French War, where she saw action at the Battle of Shipu in February 1885. Éclaireur spent the late 1880s and early 1890s in home waters before making another deployment to East Asia from 1897 to 1899. She was quickly recalled to Asia in 1900 during the Boxer Rebellion in Qing China. The ship was struck from the naval register in 1902, sold to ship breakers in 1904.

== Design ==
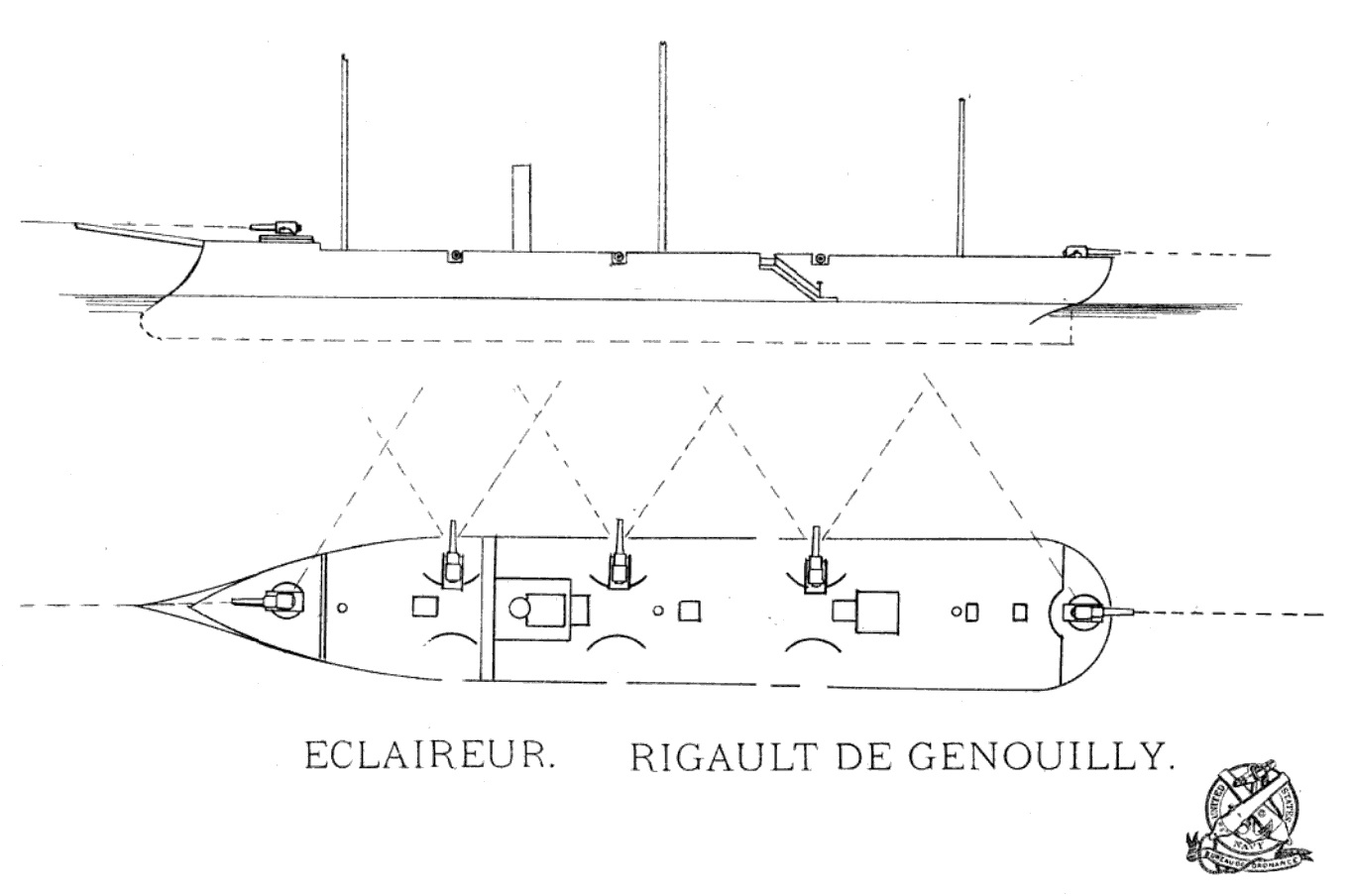
Plan and profile sketch of the Rigault de Genouilly class

The two ships of the Rigault de Genouilly class were ordered under the auspices of the naval plan of 1872, which was laid out to modernize the French Navy in the aftermath of the Franco-Prussian War of 1870–1871. The plan called for large numbers of cruisers of three different sizes: first-, second-, and third-class cruisers, the bulk of which were to be smaller and cheaper second- and third-class vessels. The third-class unprotected cruisers were to fulfill multiple functions, including fleet scouts in home waters and as patrol vessels for the French colonial empire abroad. These new ships required high speed and good sailing qualities, though a powerful armament was not needed. The design for the ships was drawn up by Arthur Bienaymé in 1872–1873.

Éclaireur was 71.9 m (235 ft 11 in) long at the waterline, with a beam of 10.8 m (35 ft 5 in) and an average draft of 4.7 m (15 ft 5 in). She displaced 1,769 t (1,741 long tons; 1,950 short tons) as designed. The ship had a ram bow and an overhanging stern. Her crew amounted to 195 officers and enlisted men. The ship's propulsion system consisted of a single compound steam engine driving a screw propeller. Steam was provided by six coal-burning fire-tube boilers that were ducted into a single funnel placed amidships. Her machinery was rated to produce 2,000 indicated horsepower (1,500 kW) for a top speed of 15 knots (28 km/h; 17 mph). At a more economical speed of 10 knots (19 km/h; 12 mph), the ship could steam for 3,130 nautical miles (5,800 km; 3,600 mi). She had a full ship rig to supplement her steam engine on long voyages overseas.

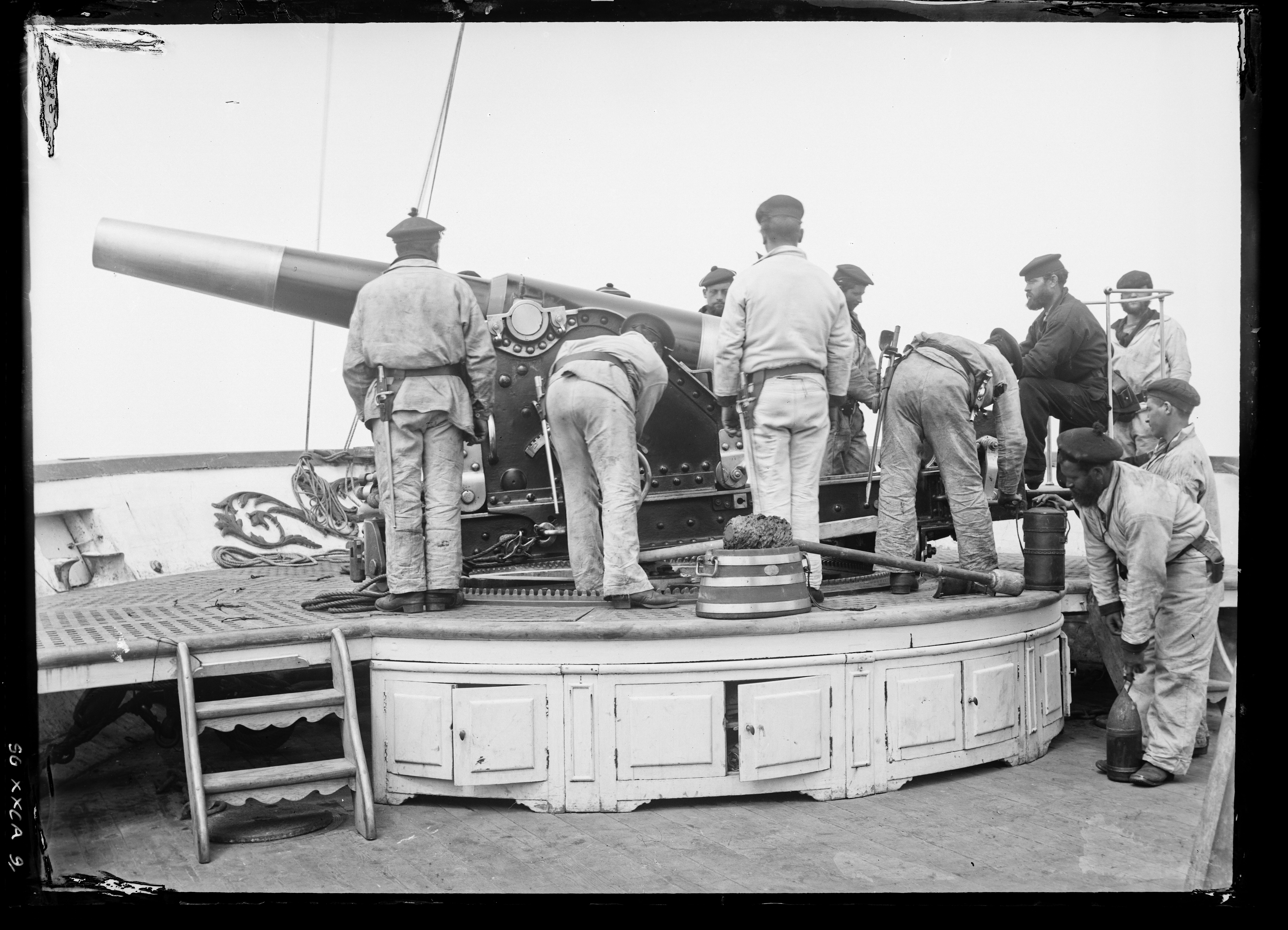
One of Éclaireur's guns

The ship was armed with a main battery of eight 138.6 mm (5.46 in) M1870M 21.3-caliber guns. One was placed atop the forecastle as a chase gun, one was on the stern, and the remainder were placed in an amidships battery on the upper deck, three guns per broadside. A pair of 37 mm (1.5 in) Hotchkiss revolver cannon provided close-range defense against torpedo boats. She also carried four 86.5 mm (3.41 in) bronze cannon that could be sent ashore with a landing party or used to arm the ship's boats.

=== Modifications ===
Éclaireur received a series of alterations throughout her career. In 1883, an additional 37 mm Hotchkiss guns was installed, and in 1888, her funnel casings were raised. She underwent a more significant modification in 1896–1897. Two more 37 mm gun were added, bringing the total to six. She also received eight Belleville boilers of the water-tube type. A new, larger funnel was installed in place of the original funnel. By 1897, she also had one 65 mm (2.6 in) gun installed. At some point during her career, her rigging was reduced to a barque plan.

== Service history ==
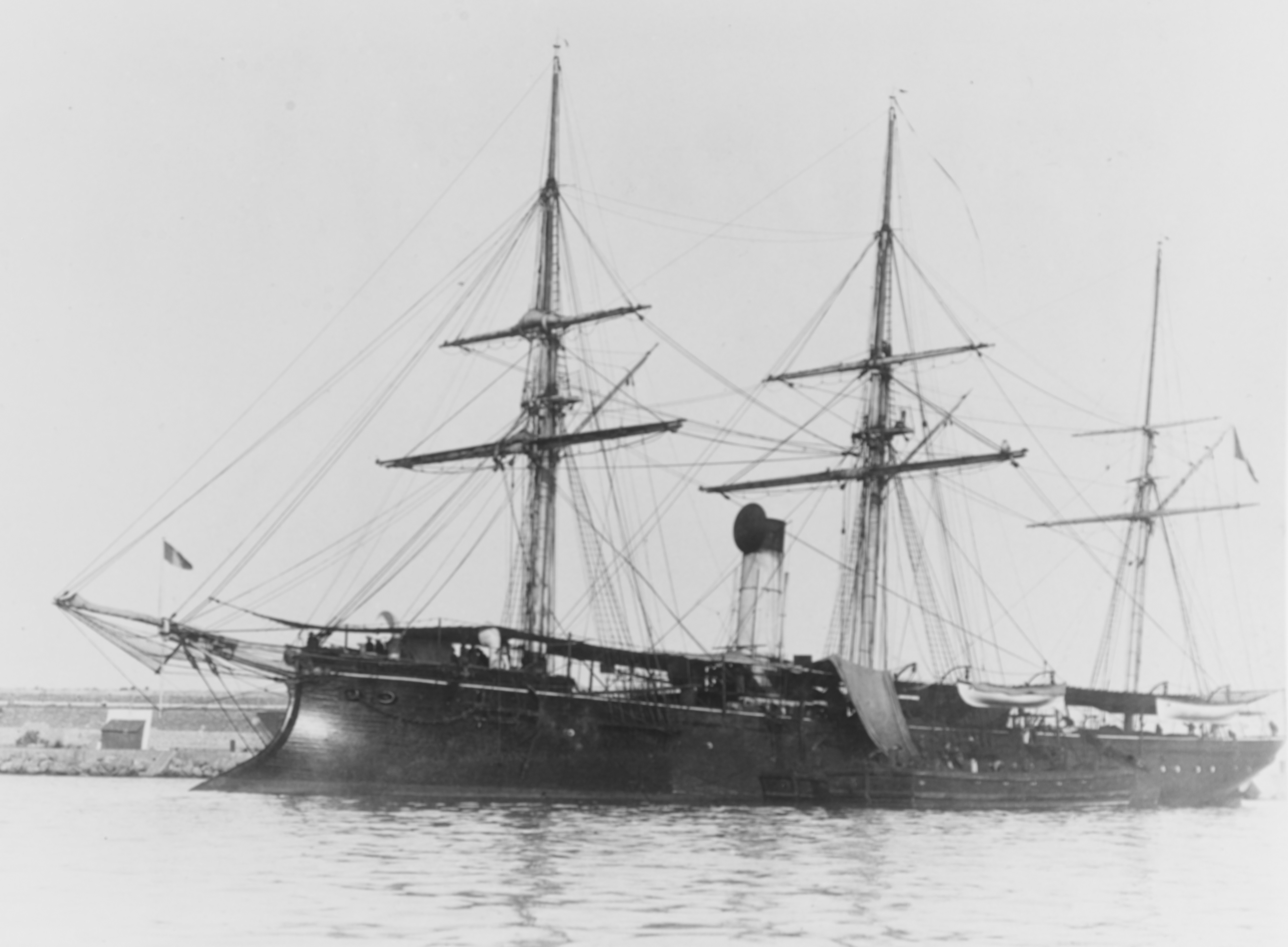
Éclaireur coaling, date unknown

The keel for Éclaireur was laid down on 5 May 1874 at the Arsenal de Toulon in Toulon. She was launched on 30 August 1877 and was commissioned to begin sea trials on 15 November 1878. These were completed by 29 July 1879, when she was placed in the 2nd category of reserve. She was recommissioned on 15 July 1881 for a deployment to the Pacific station, where she replaced the unprotected cruiser Dayot. She remained there for the next three years, and in late November 1884, she was transferred to the newly formed Far East Squadron under Rear Admiral Amédée Courbet, which had been formed during the Tonkin campaign in Vietnam.

=== Sino-French War ===
By November 1884, tensions with Qing China over France's attempt to colonize Vietnam had led to the Sino-French War. By that time, the squadron included the ironclad warships La Galissonnière (the flagship) and Triomphante, the unprotected cruisers Duguay-Trouin, Villars, D'Estaing, Volta, Nielly, Champlain, Rigault de Genouilly, and the gunboat Lutin. The French had begun a blockade of the island of Formosa, and Éclaireur was sent to patrol the area. By early 1885, the cruisers committed to the blockade included her sister Rigault de Genouilly, D'Estaing, Villars, Champlain, Rigault de Genouilly, and Lapérouse. The ships were based at Tainan, toward the southern end of the island.

==== Battle of Shipu ====
Map of French and Chinese dispositions at the Battle of Shipu

In January 1885, Courbet received word that elements of the Chinese Nanyang Fleet under Admiral Wu Ankang had sortied and were steaming south to try to break the blockade of Formosa. Accordingly, he assembled a force that included Éclaireur, the ironclads Bayard and Triomphante, the cruiser Nielly, and the gunboat Aspic, along with a supporting transport. He ordered Nielly and Triomphante to meet his other ships at Matsu at the mouth of the Min river on 3 February. By this time, the cruiser Duguay-Trouin had also joined Courbet's squadron. Courbet initially believed the Chinese squadron would attempt to reach Fuzhou via the Min river and sought to block their path on 6 February. The Chinese squadron was not there, and so Courbet took his ships north to Zhoushan to search for the Nanyang Fleet on 7 February. They arrived there four days later to find the harbor empty, so the French steamed further north to search the mouth of the Yangtze river. Duguay-Trouin was short of coal, so he ordered her to Keelung to coal.

By 12 February, Courbet had received word that Wu's ships had been spotted in Samsen Bay near Ningbo, so he ordered his ships cleared for action and back south. At dawn the following morning, lookouts aboard Éclaireur spotted five ships in the distance at about 07:00. Wu's squadron consisted of the unprotected cruisers Kai Chi, Nan Chen, and Nan Shui, the steam frigate Yuyuen, and the sloop Teng Ching; he had initially sought battle with the French, but upon realizing the superiority of Courbet's squadron, Wu decided to detach the slower Yuyuen and Teng Ching to seek shelter in Shipu, while his faster cruisers fled south. Courbet ordered his ships to steam at least 13 knots (24 km/h; 15 mph) to try to catch Wu's cruisers, but Triomphante and Aspic could not keep this speed and so he sent them to blockade Yuyuen and Teng Ching in Shipu. Courbet continued his pursuit of Wu with Nielly, Éclaireur, and Bayard, but he soon realized that he could not catch the Chinese ships, which were capable of 14 to 15 knots (26 to 28 km/h; 16 to 17 mph), and so he rejoined the rest of his squadron at Shipu at around 13:00.

Unable to enter the narrow waterways that led to Shipu's harbor, Courbet arrayed his ships to block the largest channels out and then sent steam launches to explore the approaches to the harbor. With the knowledge gained, he sent a pair of launches armed with spar torpedoes on the night of 14–15 February to attack the two Chinese vessels, sinking them both. The French learned that both vessels had been sunk on 16 February, allowing them to end the blockade. Nielly and Triomphante sailed for Keelung, while the rest of the squadron departed for Matsu. Secret negotiations between French and Chinese representatives were underway, as both countries were losing patience with the costly war, and in April, an agreement was reached that was formally signed on 9 June, ending the war.

=== Later career ===
After the war, the French began drawing down their naval strength in the region, and Éclaireur and the cruiser Villars returned to France. In 1888, the ship was dry-docked to have her boilers overhauled; work lasted into 1889. In 1891, Éclaireur was stationed at Brest, along with the cruisers Forfait and Nielly and the coastal defense ships Fulminant and Tempête. The ships were mobilized in June to take part in limited training exercises. The ships were kept in commission for the mandatory 28 days, and were sent to sea individually for training; no organized maneuvers were held that year. Éclaireur spent the rest of the year out of service in the 3rd category of reserve.

Éclaireur took part in naval exercises in July 1893, which were restricted to vessels stationed in the northern French ports. She was assigned to the defending squadron, alongside the ironclad Suffren, the coastal defense ships Requin and Fulminant, and the protected cruiser Surcouf. During the maneuvers, one of Surcouf's engines broke down and Éclaireur escorted her back to Cherbourg for repairs. The ship was placed in commission for special service in 1894, along with the ironclad Turenne, the aviso Voltigeur, and the gunboat Lèzard.

In 1896, Éclaireur was to replace the unprotected cruiser Roland, but the former's boilers were found to be in an unserviceable condition. Accordingly, she had her boilers replaced, along with additional changes to her light battery. The work was completed by January 1897, and she was recommissioned for sea trials before being placed in reserve. Later that year, Éclaireur returned for another deployment to East Asia, where she served with Bayard and the new protected cruisers Isly and Descartes. She remained in the region until 1899 when she returned to France in company with the armored cruiser Bruix. Her return to France proved short-lived, as she was sent back to China in response to the Boxer Uprising in 1900. At that time, the French squadron also included the armored cruiser Amiral Charner, the protected cruisers D'Entrecasteaux, Jean Bart, Pascal, and Descartes. Éclaireur was struck from the naval register on 4 November 1902 and placed for sale on 29 January 1903. She was eventually sold for scrap at Lorient on 22 March 1904 to ship breakers. (Note: Some contemporary sources state that instead of being dismantled, Éclaireur was resold to Peru and commissioned into service with the Peruvian Navy. The ship was listed among the Peruvian Navy's inventory as late as 1920. The same sources also list Dupuy de Lôme as having been transferred to Peru as well, when in reality the transfer never occurred and Dupuy de Lôme was eventually sold to Belgium.)
