= French cruiser Milan =

Late-19th-century unprotected cruiser in the French Navy

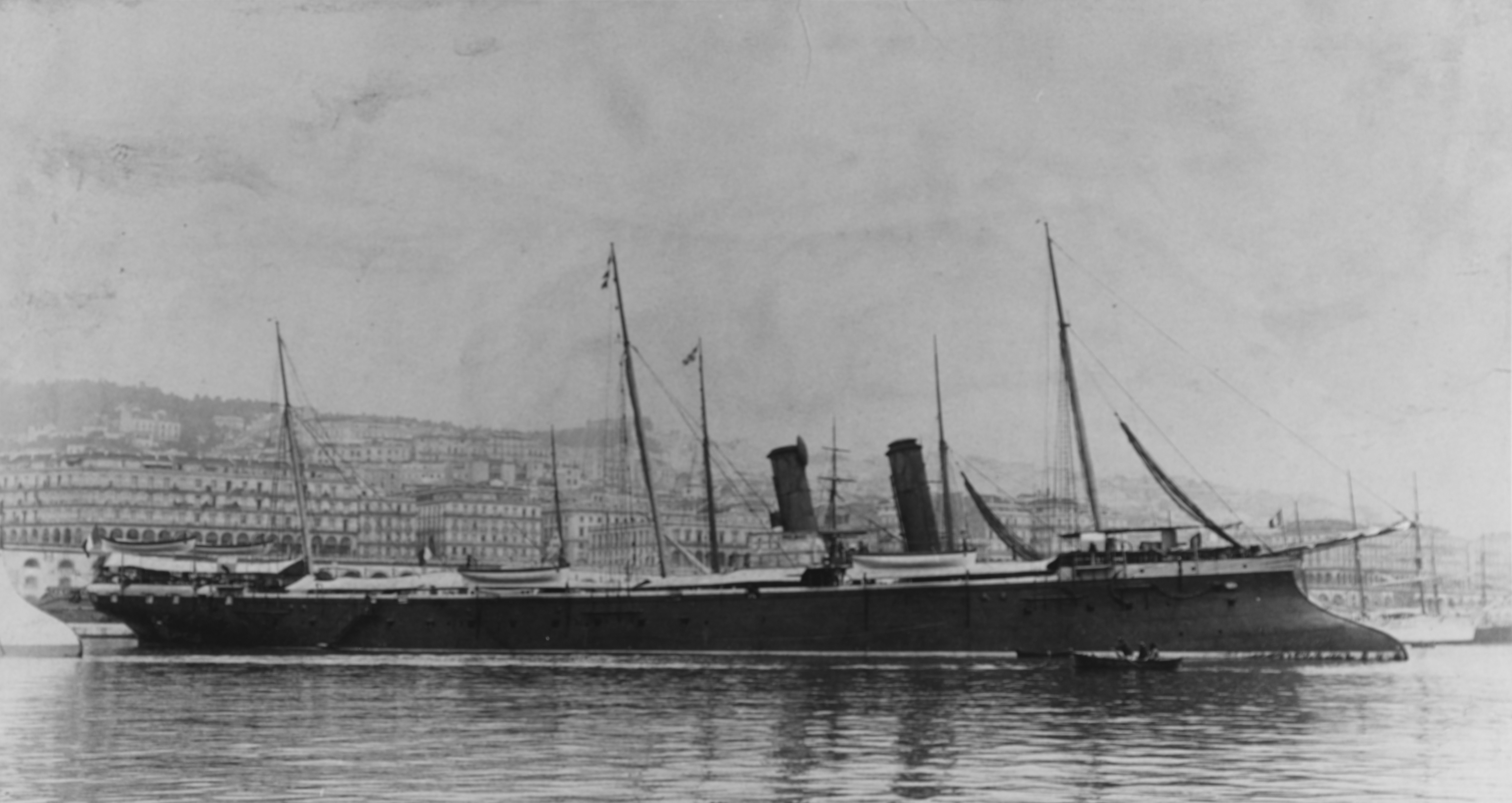
- Milan, in Algiers probably in 1889 (Note: According to the historian Stephen Roberts, the photograph was taken after the installation of 47 mm (1.9 in) guns on the sterncastle and before the gun shields for the main battery were removed, likely placing the time in 1889)

Class overview
- Preceded by: Dubourdieu
- Succeeded by: None

History

France
- Name: Milan
- Ordered: 1881
- Builder: Ateliers et Chantiers de la Loire
- Laid down: 21 March 1882
- Launched: 25 May 1884
- Commissioned: February 1885
- Decommissioned: 1 June 1907
- Stricken: 8 April 1908
- Fate: Broken up, 1911

General characteristics
- Type: Unprotected cruiser
- Displacement: 1,705 long tons (1,732 t)
- Length: 92.05 m (302 ft) loa
- Beam: 10 m (32 ft 10 in)
- Draft: 4.75 m (15 ft 7 in)
- Installed power: 12 × Belleville boilers; 4,000 ihp (3,000 kW)
- Propulsion: 2 × compound steam engines; 2 × screw propellers
- Sail plan: Fore-and-aft rig
- Speed: 18.4 knots (34.1 km/h; 21.2 mph)
- Range: 5,000 nmi (9,300 km; 5,800 mi) at 10 knots (19 km/h; 12 mph)
- Complement: 150
- Armament: 5 × 100 mm (3.9 in) guns; 8 × 37 mm (1.5 in) Hotchkiss revolver cannon

Milan was a late-19th-century unprotected cruiser in the French Navy. At the time of her completion, Milan was considered by several publications to be the fastest warship in the world. The warship was the last unprotected cruiser in French naval service, and Milan's design influenced the construction of later protected cruisers.

== Design ==
By the late 1870s, senior officers in the French Navy had come to the realization that the unprotected cruisers and avisos then in the fleet's inventory were too slow to serve as effective scouts for the main battle fleet. The Conseil des Travaux (Council of Works) of the French Navy issued a request for a new cruiser design that incorporated a high top speed and an armament solely consisting of the recently developed Whitehead torpedoes. The new ship was to have no sails, guns, or ram. Displacement was limited to around 2,000 long tons (2,032 t). The French naval engineer Louis-Émile Bertin had designed and proposed such a ship as early as 1875, and the Conseil examined his preliminary proposal at a meeting on 3 February 1880. They called for further details on 8 June, particularly concerning the propulsion machinery and the revolving torpedo launcher Bertin had suggested.

Despite the fact that they were unconvinced that Bertin's design was practical, they approved the ship on 24 May 1881 and the new ship was designated as an "éclaireur d'escadre" (fleet scout); the Conseil intended the new ship to serve primarily as an inexpensive test ship to evaluate new technologies that, should it prove to be successful, could also be used as a high-speed fleet scout. Tests with the revolving torpedo launcher proved it to be a failure, and it was discarded. Instead, a pair of individual torpedo tubes were added to the design, though their location and configuration are unknown. The gun armament was repeatedly revised between the acceptance of the design and the beginning of the ship's construction before the final armament was selected on 19 June 1882, three months after work on the ship had begun. On 19 September 1883, the torpedo tubes were removed from the ship, and so she entered service in 1886 armed only with guns, despite Bertin's original intention for the vessel.

Milan proved to be a fairly successful design, becoming what Admiral Théophile Aube, the French Minister of Marine in 1886, considered to be the ideal small cruiser. He ordered six further vessels, though these were developed into the protected cruisers of the Forbin and Troude classes.

=== Characteristics ===
Plan and profile drawing of Milan

Milan was 92.44 m (303 ft 3 in) long at the waterline, with a beam of 10.04 m (32 ft 11 in) and an average draft of 4 m (13 ft 1 in). At her stern, her draft increased to 4.77 m (15 ft 8 in). She displaced 1,672.3 t (1,645.9 long tons) normally. Her hull featured a pronounced plough bow and short fore and sterncastles. The hull was constructed with steel. As was typical for French warships of the period, she had an overhanging stern. The ship had no armor protection. Her crew consisted of 150 officers and enlisted men originally, but had increased to 191 by 1891, as additional guns were added.

The ship was propelled by a pair of horizontal compound steam engines, each driving a screw propeller. Steam was provided by twelve coal-burning water-tube Belleville boilers that were ducted into two raked funnels located amidships. Water-tube boilers were a recent development, and they allowed the ship to get steam up and accelerate much faster than older fire-tube boilers. The boilers were placed on the centerline amidships, and the coal bunkers were arranged above them, allowing the coal to be fed by gravity, significantly reducing the stoking work required. To supplement her steam engines, she was fitted with a three-masted, fore-and-aft schooner rig.

The power plant was rated to produce 3,880 indicated horsepower (2,890 kW), but on speed trials in 1885 using forced draft, she reached 3,916 ihp (2,920 kW) for a top speed of 18.47 knots (34.21 km/h; 21.25 mph); the contemporary journal The Mechanical Engineer noted that the vessel was "believed to be the fastest war vessel afloat." Milan nevertheless suffered from excessive vibration while steaming at high speed. Coal storage amounted to 308.7 t (303.8 long tons), which provided a cruising radius of 5,000 nautical miles (9,300 km; 5,800 mi) at an economical speed of 10 knots (19 km/h; 12 mph). The ship was capable of carrying extra coal that allowed her to steam for 6,100 nmi (11,300 km; 7,000 mi).

The ship was initially armed with a main battery of five 100 mm (3.9 in) guns carried in individual pivot mounts. One gun was placed on the forecastle, another was on the sterncastle, two were placed on the upper deck to starboard and the last on the deck to port. The fore- and sterncastle guns were fitted with gun shields, but the amidships guns were not. For close-range defense against torpedo boats, she carried eight 37 mm (1.5 in) 1-pounder Hotchkiss revolver cannon, all in individual shielded mounts. She also carried a single 65 mm (2.6 in) M1881 field gun that could be sent ashore with a landing party.

=== Modifications ===
A pair of minor refits were carried out in 1888; the first, begun on 7 February, removed one of the starboard 100 mm guns, and the deck space that had been occupied with the 100 mm gun was used to add equipment to allow the cruiser to lay naval mines. The second, begun on 18 December, involved the addition of a pair of 47 mm (1.9 in) M1885 quick-firing guns to the sterncastle. In 1890, Milan was decommissioned to have her armament and machinery updated, which included removing her boilers to have them thoroughly overhauled. The remaining amidships 100 mm guns were removed, leaving only the fore- and sterncastle guns. The light armament was also revised, and now consisted of ten 47 mm M1885 QF guns and two 37 mm guns, along with the 65 mm field gun. After the work was initially completed in 1892, the decision was made to convert the ship's boilers to mixed coal and oil firing, which was done between December 1892 and February 1893. A final update to her boilers was begun in January 1900, which involved removing her original twelve Belleville boilers and installing eight new models with economizers.

== Service history ==
=== Construction – 1891 ===
Sketch of Milan early in her career

Milan was ordered in 1881 and placed on the navy's list in January 1882. She was laid down at the Ateliers et Chantiers de la Loire shipyard in Saint-Nazaire on 21 March 1882, and was launched on 25 May 1884. The ship was commissioned to begin sea trials in February 1885 as the nation's first steel cruiser. Initial testing took place off Brest and lasted from 12 March to 6 August, and two days later she was placed in full commission for active service. On 11 August, she departed for Toulon on France's Mediterranean coast, arriving there six days later. There, she joined the Escadre d'évolutions (Training Squadron) on 19 January 1886. The training Squadron consisted of those ships of the Mediterranean Squadron that conducted routine training exercises each year. The ship took part in the annual large-scale fleet maneuvers with the Mediterranean Squadron that year, which were held off Toulon from 10 to 17 May. She was attached to the ironclads of the First Division for the duration of the maneuvers. The exercises were used to test the effectiveness of torpedo boats in defending the coastline from a squadron of ironclads, whether cruisers and torpedo boats could break through a blockade of ironclads, and whether a flotilla of torpedo boats could intercept ironclads at sea.

In May 1887, Milan took part in exercises to practice convoy escort; the French Army kept significant forces in French North Africa, and these units would have to be transported back to Europe in the event of a major conflict. The ship was assigned to escort a convoy of four simulated troop ships, along with four ironclads, the unprotected cruiser Hirondelle, the torpedo cruiser Condor, and the torpedo boats Balny and Déroulède. A squadron of cruisers and torpedo boats was tasked with intercepting the convoy. The convoy used bad weather to make the passage, as heavy seas kept the torpedo boats from going to sea. Milan remained with the unit through 1889. She took part in the annual fleet maneuvers that year in company with nine ironclads, three cruisers, and several smaller craft. The exercises lasted from 30 June to 6 July, and included simulated attacks on the French Mediterranean coast.

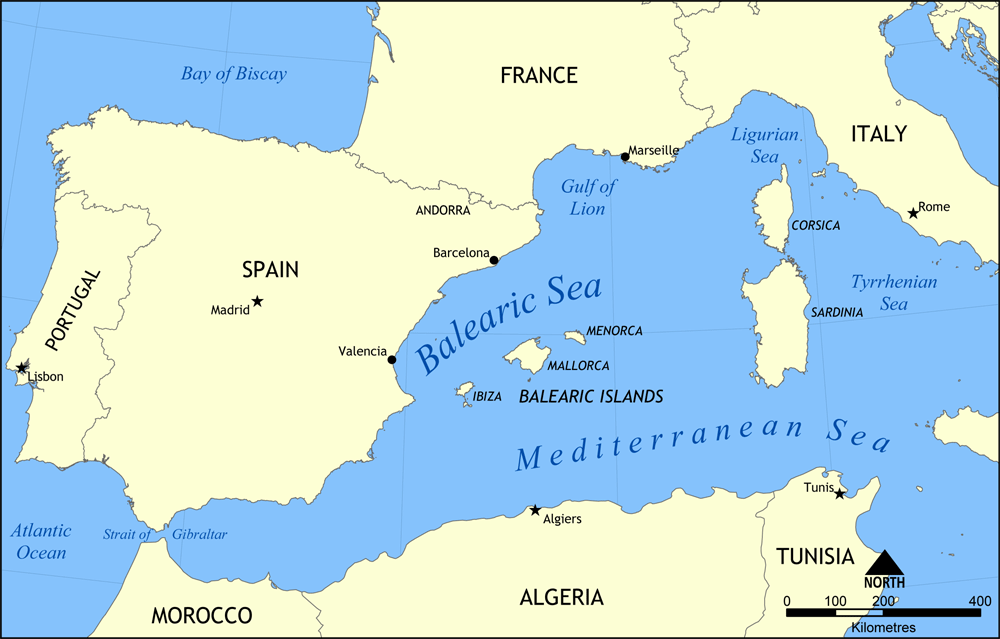
Map of the western Mediterranean, where Milan operated for much of her career

Joint maneuvers were held in 1890 with the combined Mediterranean Fleet and Northern Squadron. The ships of the Mediterranean Fleet arrived in Brest on 2 July and began the maneuvers four days later; the exercises ended on 25 July. Milan was attached to the Fourth Division of the Second Squadron for the maneuvers, along with the ironclads Bayard, Duguesclin, and Vauban, the unprotected cruiser Rigault de Genouilly, the torpedo gunboat Couleuvrine, and two torpedo boats. During the exercises, on 17 July, the torpedo gunboat Dague broke down and Milan had to tow her back to port. Later that day, Milan struck an uncharted rock outside of Brest, which tore a 0.91 by 2.13 m (3 by 7 ft) hole in her hull. Milan's pumps barely kept up with the flooding and she limped back into Brest for repairs. The hole was temporarily patched in three days to allow the vessel to participate in the final days of operations. She was thereafter taken to the FCM shipyard in La Seyne-sur-Mer for repairs and modifications that lasted from 1890 to 1893. Milan was recommissioned for sea trials on 1 July 1892, but further work was carried out, lasting into 1893, and she was finally completed and recommissioned to full service on 5 April.

=== 1893–1908 ===
By 1893, Milan had been replaced in front-line service by the protected cruisers her design had inspired, the Forbin and Troude classes, and she was placed in reserve. She was reactivated later that year to take part in the annual fleet maneuvers as part of the Reserve Squadron. The exercises took place in two phases, the first from 1 to 10 July and the second from 17 to 28 July. Milan remained with the Reserve Squadron through 1894; the unit was kept in commission for only part of the year for training. At that time, the unit consisted of six ironclads, the protected cruiser Forbin, Condor, and forty-eight torpedo boats of various sizes. Milan was retained in the unit in 1895, by which time the composition of the squadron had been altered to five ironclads, two protected cruisers, two torpedo cruisers, and three torpedo gunboats. She participated in the fleet maneuvers that year, which lasted from 1 to 27 July.

Milan continued to serve in the Reserve Squadron in 1896, by which time the unit also included four ironclads, three protected cruisers, and two torpedo cruisers. The ships of the squadron were fully-manned only for the annual fleet maneuvers; they otherwise kept only half to two-thirds of their crews for the rest of the year. The unit was based in Toulon, along with the Active Squadron. Milan participated in the annual maneuvers as part of the Reserve Squadron's cruiser screen, along with the protected cruisers Lalande, Amiral Cécille, and Sfax and the torpedo cruiser Léger. The maneuvers for that year took place from 6 to 30 July and the Reserve Squadron served as the simulated enemy. Milan remained in the unit for 1897, participating in the fleet exercises in July as part of the "enemy" unit. The maneuvers lasted from 7 to 30 July and included night maneuvers, fleet defense against torpedo boats, and simulated battle between squadrons of battleships. The Reserve Squadron was reduced in size in 1898, including only three ironclads, the armored cruiser Chanzy, and Léger in addition to Milan. She took part in the maneuvers that year, which lasted from 5 to 25 July.

Milan was decommissioned again on 1 January 1900 for another overhaul that lasted through 1901; she was recommissioned on 15 December that year, but she saw no further active service. She was eventually decommissioned for the last time on 1 June 1907. The last-surviving unprotected cruiser in the navy's inventory, Milan was stricken from the naval register on 8 April 1908 and subsequently used as a training ship for engine room personnel, replacing the old torpedo cruiser Vautour in that role from 1908 to 1910. Milan was in turn replaced by the protected cruiser Chasseloup-Laubat in December 1910, and was thereafter sold on 1 August 1911 to M. Bénédic and broken up in La Seyne.
