= French cruiser Hirondelle =

- Hirondelle, probably at Algiers in the 1880s

Class overview
- Preceded by: Bourayne class
- Succeeded by: Rigault de Genouilly class

History

France
- Name: Hirondelle
- Ordered: 20 January 1868
- Builder: Chantiers et Ateliers Augustin Normand
- Laid down: 1 July 1868
- Launched: 15 May 1869
- Commissioned: 12 July 1870
- Stricken: 11 December 1896
- Fate: Broken up, 1928

General characteristics
- Displacement: 1,162 t (1,144 long tons; 1,281 short tons)
- Length: 79 m (259 ft 2 in) loa
- Beam: 9.25 m (30 ft 4 in)
- Draft: 3.81 m (12 ft 6 in) (average)
- Installed power: 6 × Belleville boilers; 2,124.8 ihp (1,584.5 kW)
- Propulsion: 2 × marine steam engines; 2 × screw propellers
- Sail plan: Schooner rig
- Speed: 16.41 knots (30.39 km/h; 18.88 mph)
- Complement: 114
- Armament: 2 × 86.5 mm (3.41 in) guns

Hirondelle was a third-class unprotected cruiser of the French Navy built in the late 1860s. Originally ordered as an imperial yacht by Napoleon III, the ship was taken into naval service shortly after commissioning in 1870 during the Franco-Prussian War. She was modified several times in the 1870s and early 1880s as different armaments were tried. Hirondelle served with the Mediterranean Fleet through the 1880s, participating in routine training exercises with the ironclad warships of the fleet. The ship was discarded in 1896, but served as an accommodation hulk for nearly two decades. She was eventually broken up in 1928.

== Design ==
Hirondelle was originally ordered as a yacht for Emperor Napoleon III of France in 1868. Among the criteria for the new ship was a restriction on the draft to a maximum of 4 m (13 ft) to permit the vessel to enter the Adour river. Speed was to be 16 knots (30 km/h; 18 mph) and coal storage must be sufficient for two days of steaming. Napoleon also sought to use the vessel as a testbed for new technologies, including mixed coal and fuel oil firing for the boilers, high-pressure machinery, and a twin-screw propeller propulsion system. Augustin Normand prepared the design for the ship, construction of which was overseen by Henri Dupuy de Lôme.

=== Characteristics ===
Hirondelle was 76.3 m (250 ft 4 in) long between perpendiculars, 76.65 m (251 ft 6 in) long at the waterline, and 79 m (259 ft 2 in) long overall. She had a beam of 9.25 m (30 ft 4 in); her draft was on average 3.81 m (12 ft 6 in) and a maximum of 4.06 m (13 ft 4 in) aft. She displaced 1,162 metric tons (1,144 long tons; 1,281 short tons). Her crew consisted of 114 officers and enlisted men. She had a wooden hull with a clipper bow and a large poop deck. As completed, Hirondelle was fitted with two 4-pounder, 86.5 mm (3.41 in), 11-caliber M1858 muzzle-loading guns.

The ship's propulsion system consisted of six Belleville boilers that supplied steam to a pair of two-cylinder marine steam engines. The boilers were vented through a single funnel. Her engines produced 2,124.8 indicated horsepower (1,584.5 kW) for a top speed of 16.41 knots (30.39 km/h; 18.88 mph). This made her the fastest yacht in the world for the next ten years following her completion in 1869. To supplement the steam engines on longer voyages, Hirondelle was fitted with a two-masted schooner rig.

=== Modifications ===
On entering naval service, a pair of 138 mm (5.4 in) guns were installed in place of the original guns, but it was found that Hirondelle could only comfortably carry a single weapon of that weight. Accordingly, in 1873, her armament was reduced to a single gun, though it was converted to a movable mounting that could be transferred to sponsons that were located amidships. A single bronze, 12-pounder 121 mm (4.8 in) gun was added.

In 1874, Hirondelle had her propulsion system upgraded. The engines were converted to compound machinery by adding high-pressure cylinders to the existing engines. New boilers were also installed. Work was completed by May 1876, and the new propulsion system produced 1,916 ihp (1,429 kW) for a top speed of 15.57 knots (28.84 km/h; 17.92 mph). Coal storage was set at 146.1 t (143.8 long tons; 161.0 short tons), which provided a cruising radius of 3,440 nautical miles (6,370 km; 3,960 mi) at 10 knots (19 km/h; 12 mph).

By 1881, the ship's armament had been revised again, now to two 100 mm (3.9 in) guns and four 37 mm (1.5 in) Hotchkiss revolver cannon for defense against torpedo boats.

== Service history ==
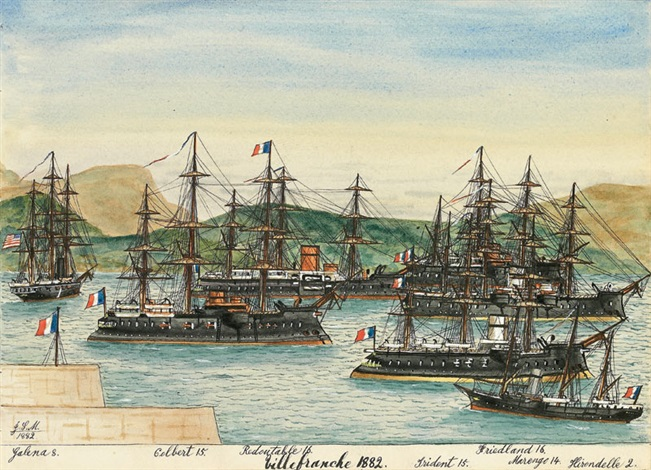
Painting of the French fleet c. 1882; Hirondelle is the bottom-right ship

The contract for Hirondelle was placed on 20 January 1868. The keel for the new ship was laid down at the Chantiers et Ateliers Augustin Normand shipyard in Le Havre on 1 July that year. She was launched on 15 May 1869, and commissioned to begin sea trials on 10 August. The ship was placed in full commission on 12 July 1870, but had not yet entered service as the imperial yacht when the Franco-Prussian War broke out later that month; Hirondelle was mobilized into service with the French Navy in August. In September, she was sent to inform Admiral Martin Fourichon that Napoleon's government had collapsed following the latter's surrender at the Battle of Sedan, and that Fourichon had been appointed as the naval minister. Hirondelle found Fourichon at Cherbourg. After the war ended in January 1871, the French Navy formally acquired Hirondelle, initially classifying her as an aviso. She was then decommissioned on 19 July and placed in reserve.

Hirondelle next returned to service on 15 February 1873 to conduct additional sea trials, which lasted until 1 August, when she was returned to the reserve. Modifications to her engines began the following year; the work lasted into 1875, and another period of testing began on 13 September. Hirondelle finally entered active service with the Mediterranean Fleet on 26 May 1876, when she was assigned to the northern division of the Escadre d'évolution (Training Squadron), which operated in the Mediterranean Sea. In 1880, Hirondelle was assigned to a cruiser squadron that consisted of the screw frigate Flore, the flagship, and the old corvette Desaix. The ships participated in a naval review at Cherbourg in August. Hirondelle served in the Mediterranean Fleet again in 1882 as a dispatch boat for the ironclad warships of the main fleet.

In 1884, Hirondelle took part in a training cruise with the Mediterranean Fleet from Toulon to Nice for a sailing regatta. The fleet departed on 14 April and encountered heavy seas, and the coastal defense ships Vengeur and Tonnerre and the aviso Renard were forced to seek shelter while the rest of the fleet proceeded on. Hirondelle was later detached to locate the three stragglers and bring them to Nice. Hirondelle lost one of her cutters in the storm. Hirondelle saw service again in 1885 as part of the Escadre d'évolution; that year, the unit consisted of the ironclads Dévastation, Colbert, Suffren, and Amiral Duperré, along with Desaix and four torpedo boats. A training cruise that year included a visit to Corfu and ended in Toulon on 5 May. The ship participated in the large-scale fleet maneuvers held in May 1886, where she served as the cruiser that escorted the 2nd Division of the fleet, which comprised the ironclads Redoutable, Suffren, Vauban, and Dévastation. The maneuvers tested whether torpedo boats could defend a major port like Toulon from a squadron of ironclads, and whether the squadron could effectively blockade the port. Hirondelle screened the ironclads during these operations, and was driven off by the cruiser Aréthuse.

Hirondelle took part in exercises to practice convoy escort in May 1887; the French Army kept significant forces in French North Africa, and these units would have to be transported back to Europe in the event of a major conflict. The ship was assigned to escort a convoy of four simulated troop ships, along with four ironclads, the unprotected cruiser Milan, the torpedo cruiser Condor, and the torpedo boats Balny and Déroulède. A squadron of cruisers and torpedo boats was tasked with intercepting the convoy. The convoy used bad weather to make the passage, as heavy seas kept the torpedo boats from going to sea.

By 1891, Hirondelle had been stationed in Tunis, along with a torpedo boat and support vessels. She was still there by 1896, but she was relieved there that year by the torpedo cruiser Condor. Hirondelle was condemned on 11 December that year, ending her career with the navy. She was converted into an accommodation hulk for an orphanage in Martigues; she was also used as a training ship for local fishermen. These activities lasted until 1914. The ship was placed for sale in Toulon in 1920, but remained idle until 1927, when she was sold to ship breakers, who dismantled Hirondelle over the course of 1928.
