= French cruiser Forbin =

Protected cruiser of the French Navy

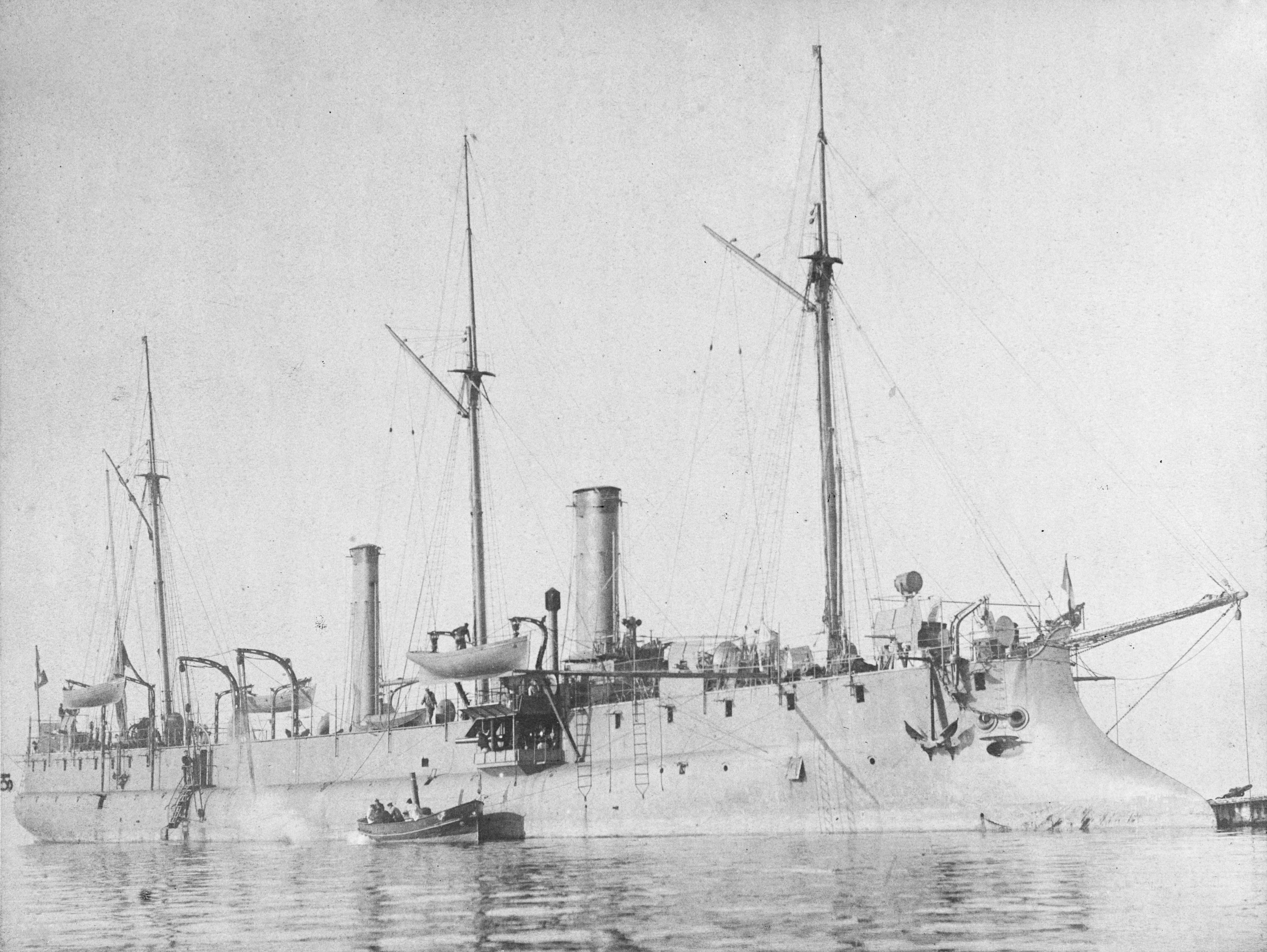
- Forbin in Toulon around 1890

History

France
- Name: Forbin
- Ordered: 7 April 1886
- Builder: Arsenal de Rochefort
- Laid down: May 1886
- Launched: 14 January 1888
- Commissioned: 15 November 1888
- Decommissioned: 1 November 1911
- Stricken: 27 November 1913
- Fate: Broken up, 1921

General characteristics
- Class & type: Forbin-class cruiser
- Displacement: 1,857 t (1,828 long tons; 2,047 short tons)
- Length: 96.1 m (315 ft 3 in) loa
- Beam: 9.33 m (30 ft 7 in)
- Draft: 4.5 m (14 ft 9 in)
- Installed power: 6 × fire-tube boilers; 6,200 ihp (4,600 kW)
- Propulsion: 2 × compound steam engines; 2 × screw propellers
- Sail plan: Schooner rig
- Speed: 20 knots (37 km/h; 23 mph)
- Range: 2,400 nmi (4,400 km; 2,800 mi) at 10 knots (19 km/h; 12 mph)
- Complement: 209
- Armament: 4 × 138.6 mm (5.46 in) guns; 3 × 47 mm (1.9 in) guns; 4 × 37 mm (1.5 in) Hotchkiss revolver cannon; 4 × 356 mm (14 in) torpedo tubes
- Armor: Deck: 40 mm (1.6 in)

Forbin was a protected cruiser, the lead ship of the Forbin class, built in the late 1880s for the French Navy. The class was built as part of a construction program intended to provide scouts for the main battle fleet. They were based on the earlier unprotected cruiser Milan, with the addition of an armor deck to improve their usefulness in battle. They had a high top speed for the time, at around 20 knots (37 km/h; 23 mph), and they carried a main battery of four 138 mm (5.4 in) guns.

Forbin spent the 1890s in the Reserve Squadron, based in the Mediterranean Sea; during this period, she was kept in partial commission to participate in annual training exercises. She was in reserve by 1901, when she had an ammunition fire related to unstable Poudre B propellant charges. Forbin was reactivated in 1906 for service with the Northern Squadron. By 1911, she had been moved to the Moroccan Naval Division. She was converted into a collier in 1913 and was used in that capacity until she was struck from the naval register in 1919. The ship was sold for scrap in 1921.

== Design ==
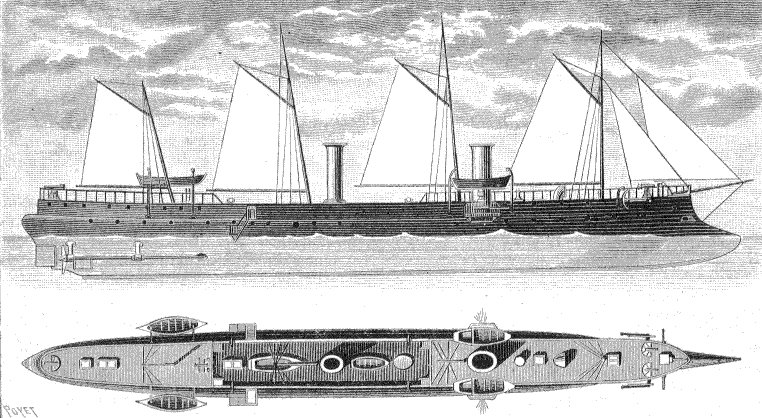
Profile drawing of an early version of the Forbin design, depicting the original four-masted rig used aboard Forbin

Beginning in 1879, the French Navy's Conseil des Travaux (Council of Works) had requested designs for small but fast cruisers of about 2,000 long tons (2,032 t) displacement that could be used as scouts for the main battle fleet. The unprotected cruiser Milan was the first of the type, which was developed into the Forbin-type of protected cruisers after the Conseil requested light armor protection for the ships. The three Forbins, along with the three very similar Troude-class cruisers, were ordered by Admiral Théophile Aube, then the French Minister of Marine and an ardent supporter of the Jeune École doctrine. Aube intended to use the new cruisers as commerce raiders, rather than fleet scouts.

Forbin was 95 m (311 ft 8 in) long at the waterline and 96.1 m (315 ft 3 in) long overall, with a beam of 9.33 m (30 ft 7 in) and an average draft of 4.5 m (14 ft 9 in). She displaced 1,857 t (1,828 long tons; 2,047 short tons). Her crew amounted to 209 officers and enlisted men. The ship's propulsion system consisted of a pair of compound steam engines driving two screw propellers. Steam was provided by six coal-burning fire-tube boilers that were ducted into two funnels. Her machinery was rated to produce 6,200 indicated horsepower (4,600 kW) for a top speed of 20 knots (37 km/h; 23 mph). She had a cruising radius of 2,395 nautical miles (4,436 km; 2,756 mi) at a speed of 10 knots (19 km/h; 12 mph).

The ship was armed with a main battery of four 138.6 mm (5.46 in) 30-caliber guns in individual pivot mounts, all in sponsons with two guns per broadside. For close-range defense against torpedo boats, she carried three 47 mm (1.9 in) 3-pounder Hotchkiss guns and four 37 mm (1.5 in) 1-pounder Hotchkiss revolver cannon. She was also armed with four 356 mm (14 in) torpedo tubes in her hull above the waterline, two forward and two further aft. She had provisions to carry up to 150 naval mines. Armor protection consisted of an armor deck that was 40 mm (1.6 in) thick and sloped downward at the sides to provide a measure of vertical protection. Above the deck, a highly subdivided layer of watertight compartments was intended to control flooding. A thin anti-splinter deck below the armor deck covered the machinery spaces.

=== Modifications ===
Forbin's initial design called for a four-masted sailing rig and a main battery of just two 138.6 mm guns, but during construction her specifications were revised; a second pair of guns was added to strengthen her combat power relative to foreign counterparts. And during her initial trials in 1889, the original rigging proved to be of little use and the schooner rig was installed in its place. In 1892–1893, the ship underwent a refit. Her rigging was further reduced by the removal of her main mast and the bowsprit, though the fore and mizzenmasts were moved closer together. The main battery was converted to quick firing, and the light armament now consisted of five 47 mm guns, three 37 mm guns, and four 37 mm revolver cannon. In 1896, the two forward torpedo tubes were removed, along with the shields for the light guns. The ship underwent another refit in 1905 that included removing all of the 37 mm guns in favor of a uniform light armament of nine 47 mm guns. Two 37 mm guns were kept aboard to be mounted to the ship's boats. By that time, the remaining torpedo tubes had also been removed. The following year, the remaining sails were removed.

== Service history ==
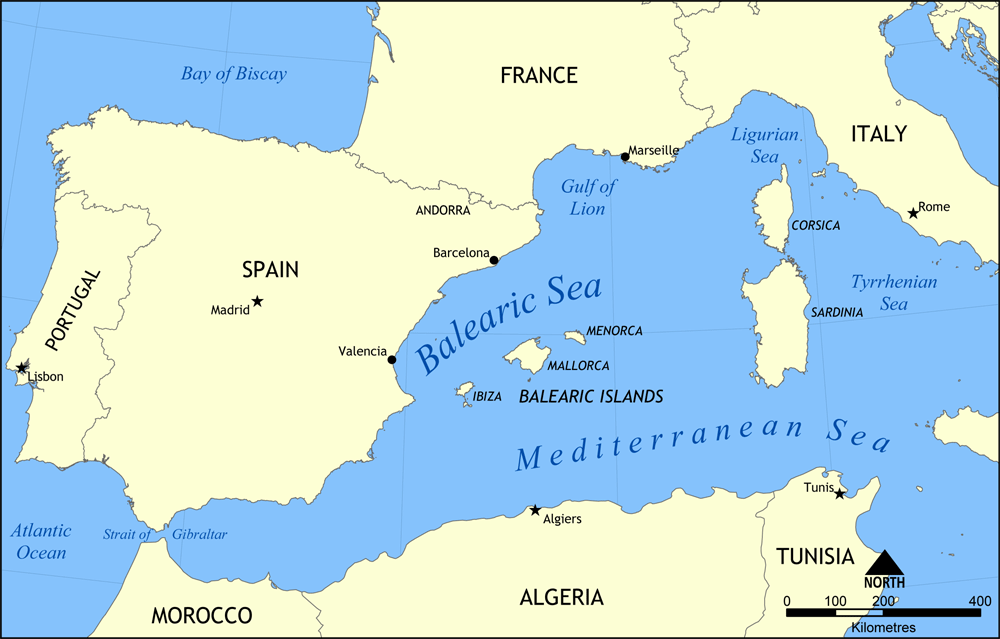
Map of the western Mediterranean, where Forbin operated for much of her career

Forbin was placed on the navy list in January 1886 and ordered on 7 April. Her keel was laid down at the Arsenal de Rochefort shipyard in Rochefort in May 1886. She was launched on 14 January 1888 and was commissioned for sea trials on 15 November, the first member of her class to enter service. She was initially completed with just two of her 138 mm guns, but the other pair were quickly added. Forbin completed her trials by early 1889, and she was commissioned for active service on 1 February. She remained in Rochefort for much of the rest of the year, before departing on 22 December for Toulon, where she joined the Mediterranean Squadron.

By 1893, Forbin had been transferred to the Reserve Squadron, where she spent six months of the year on active service with full crews for maneuvers; the rest of the year was spent laid up with a reduced crew. At that time, the unit also included several older ironclads and the cruisers Tage, Sfax, Davout, and Condor. Forbin took part in the fleet maneuvers in 1894; from 9 to 16 July, the ships involved took on supplies in Toulon for the maneuvers that began later on the 16th. A series of exercises included shooting practice, a blockade simulation, and scouting operations in the western Mediterranean. During the operations, the torpedo boats Audacieux and Mousquetaire collided and Forbin had to take Audacieux under tow back to Toulon. The maneuvers concluded on 3 August.

She was still serving in the unit in 1895, along with Sfax and the unprotected cruiser Milan. She took part in the fleet maneuvers that year, which began on 1 July and concluded on the 27th. She was assigned to "Fleet C", which represented the hostile Italian fleet, which was tasked with defeating "Fleet A" and "Fleet B", which represented the French fleet; the latter two units were individually inferior to "Fleet C", but superior when combined. Forbin remained in the Reserve Squadron in 1897. At some point later in her career, after 1896, Forbin was modernized at Rochefort. She had her mainmast removed, along with all of her torpedo tubes, and she received five more 47 mm guns. Her boilers were replaced with Niclausse-type water-tube boilers and were adapted to incorporate mixed coal and oil firing.

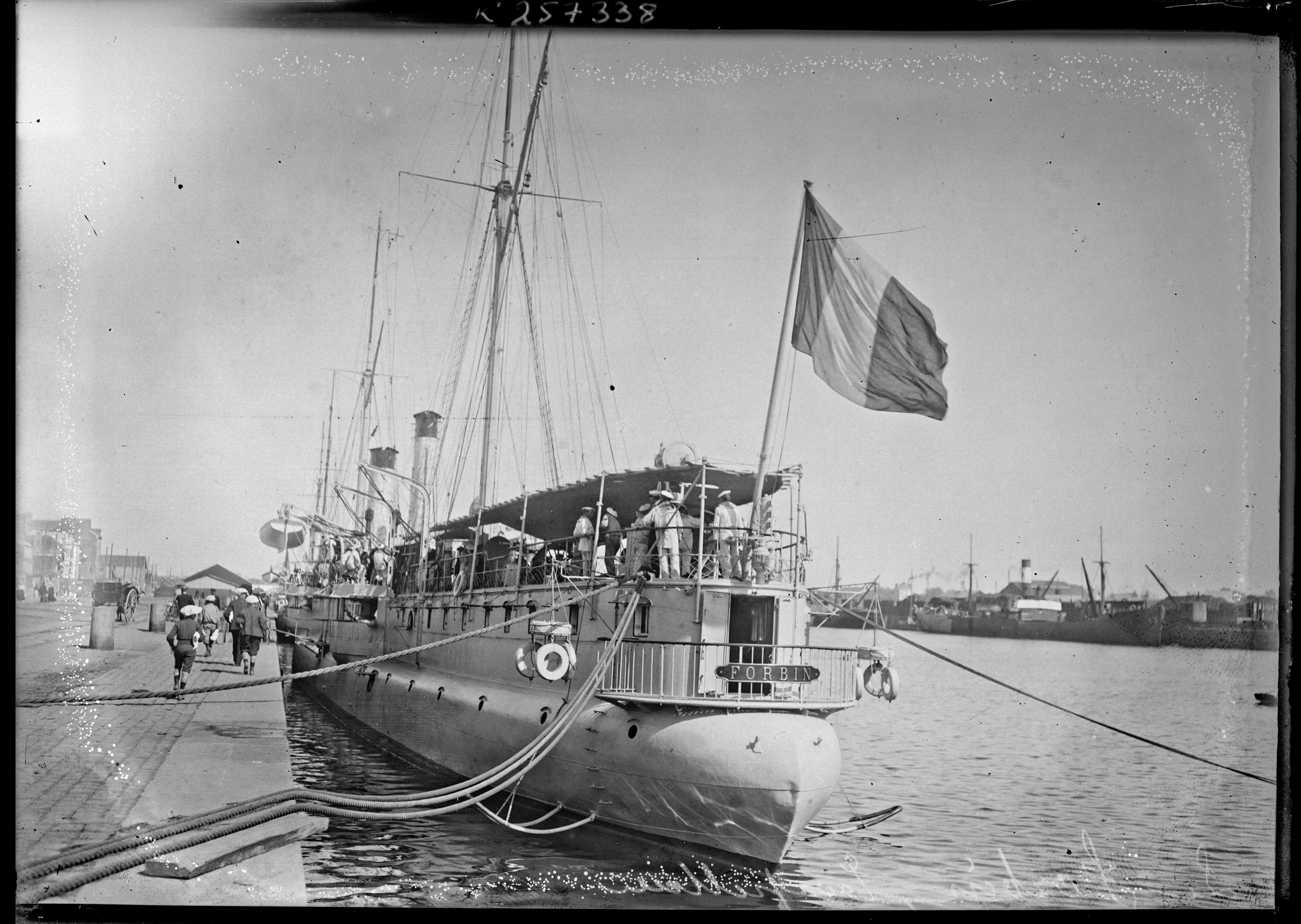
Stern view of Forbin at harbour, between 1904 and 1908

By January 1901, Forbin and both of her sister ships had been reduced to the reserve fleet. On 14 April 1901, an accidental propellant fire occurred aboard Forbin, part of a series of fires that resulted from unstable Poudre B charges. The incident occurred at sea steaming from Rochefort to Brest, while the crew was stowing ammunition. Five men were burned in the accident, but the fire did not detonate any adjacent charges and Forbin was only lightly damaged. That night, several men were found to have nearly asphyxiated from the toxic fumes that had been released by the fire. The ship was attached to the Reserve Division of the Northern Squadron in 1906, along with three armored cruisers. She took part in the fleet maneuvers that year, which began on 6 July with the concentration of the Northern and Mediterranean Squadrons in Algiers in French Algeria. The maneuvers were conducted in the western Mediterranean, alternating between ports in French North Africa and Toulon and Marseille, France, and concluding on 4 August. She was present for the 1907 fleet maneuvers, which again saw the Northern and Mediterranean Squadrons unite for large-scale operations held off the coast of French Morocco and in the western Mediterranean. The exercises consisted of two phases and began on 2 July and concluded on 20 July.

The ship remained in service with the Northern Squadron in 1908, by which time it had been reorganized as a cruiser force, consisting of eight armored cruisers and four other protected cruisers. At some point in 1911, Forbin was assigned to the Moroccan Naval Division, where she patrolled French Morocco until 27 September, when she was replaced by the cruiser Lavoisier. Forbin was decommissioned on 1 November and was condemned on 20 March 1912. She nevertheless returned to the unit later that year and operated in company with Lavoisier from September, when that vessel returned to the area. On 9 April 1913, the navy allocated Forbin for use as a storage hulk based in Rochefort, and she was struck from the naval register there on 27 November. During World War I, Forbin was selected to be converted into a coal storage hulk on 28 April 1917. Her propulsion system was removed to create space for coal bunkers capable of holding 1,250 t (1,230 long tons; 1,380 short tons), and eight cranes for transferring coal were installed. On 1 February 1918, the tug Utrech towed Forbin to Corfu, which was the French fleet's primary naval base during the conflict. She remained there through the end of the war in 1918, and was towed out on 14 July 1919. The tug Byzantion took the ship to Piraeus, Greece, where she was sold to ship breakers in 1921.
