= Rigault de Genouilly-class cruiser =

Group of cruisers built in the 19th century for the French Navy

- Rigault de Genouilly

Class overview
- Name: Rigault de Genouilly class
- Operators: Marine Nationale
- Preceded by: Hirondelle
- Succeeded by: Duquesne class
- Built: 1873–1878
- In service: 1879–1902
- Completed: 2
- Retired: 2

General characteristics
- Type: Unprotected cruiser
- Displacement: 1,769 t (1,741 long tons; 1,950 short tons)
- Length: 71.9 m (235 ft 11 in) lwl
- Beam: 10.8 m (35 ft 5 in)
- Draft: 4.7 m (15 ft 5 in)
- Installed power: 6 × fire-tube boilers; 2,000 ihp (1,500 kW)
- Propulsion: 1 × compound steam engine; 1 × screw propeller
- Sail plan: Full ship rig
- Speed: 15 knots (28 km/h; 17 mph)
- Range: 3,130 nmi (5,800 km; 3,600 mi) at 10 knots (19 km/h; 12 mph)
- Complement: 195
- Armament: 8 × 138.6 mm (5.46 in) guns; 2 × 37 mm (1.5 in) Hotchkiss revolver cannon

The Rigault de Genouilly class was a pair of unprotected cruisers—Rigault de Genouilly and Éclaireur—that were built for the French Navy in the 1870s. The ships were rated as third-class cruisers and were intended to fill multiple roles, including as scouts for the French fleet, and to patrol the French colonial empire; as such, they were given a high top speed of 15 knots (28 km/h; 17 mph) and were optimized to use their sailing rig for long voyages abroad. They were armed with a main battery of eight 138.6 mm (5.46 in) guns. The two ships were laid down in 1873 and 1874, and both were completed by 1878. A third ship, provisionally designated "N", was planned but not built.

== Design ==
In 1871, following the end of the Franco-Prussian War, the French Navy began to make preparations for the various classes of ships that would be needed to strengthen the fleet as part of the naval construction program that would be formalized the following year. One major component of the plan was a major expansion of the fleet's cruising vessels. The plan called for large numbers of cruisers of three different sizes: first-, second-, and third-class cruisers, the bulk of which were to be smaller and cheaper second- and third-class vessels. These cruisers would serve a multitude of roles, from patrolling the French colonial empire abroad, cruising in European waters, and to serving as fleet scouts. The Conseil des Travaux (Council of Works) issued a direction that new third-class cruisers—which were at that time rated as 1st class avisos—would need to fulfill the latter two requirements, and as such needed to be fast and to handle well under sail, though combat power was not a priority. The Conseil stated that general requirements for new vessels of the type should have a top speed of 15 knots (28 km/h; 17 mph), a cruising range of 3,000 nautical miles (5,600 km; 3,500 mi) at 10 knots (19 km/h; 12 mph), an armament of six 138.6 mm (5.46 in) guns, and a large sailing rig. Displacement was set at around 1,450 metric tons (1,430 long tons; 1,600 short tons).

The naval minister, Louis Pothuau, altered the Conseil's recommendations by substituting two of the 138.6 mm guns for a pair of 164.7 mm (6.48 in) guns, but left the other specifications unchanged. He forwarded the requirements to the various French shipyards on 16 February 1872 to solicit more specific design proposals. By 29 October, the Conseil had received six submissions, and at that time they evaluated the designs. During the meeting that day, they selected the proposal by Arthur Bienaymé, but requested several modifications; he returned his updated design by 28 January 1873, which was approved by Pothuau's successor, Charles de Dompierre d'Hornoy, on 20 June. At some point later that year, the armament was revised again, reverting to a uniform main battery of 138.6 mm guns, but increasing their number to eight. Two vessels, Rigault de Genouilly and Éclaireur, were placed on the list in 1874. A third unnamed ship, designated "N", was allocated to the 1876 budget, but she was never built.

=== Characteristics ===
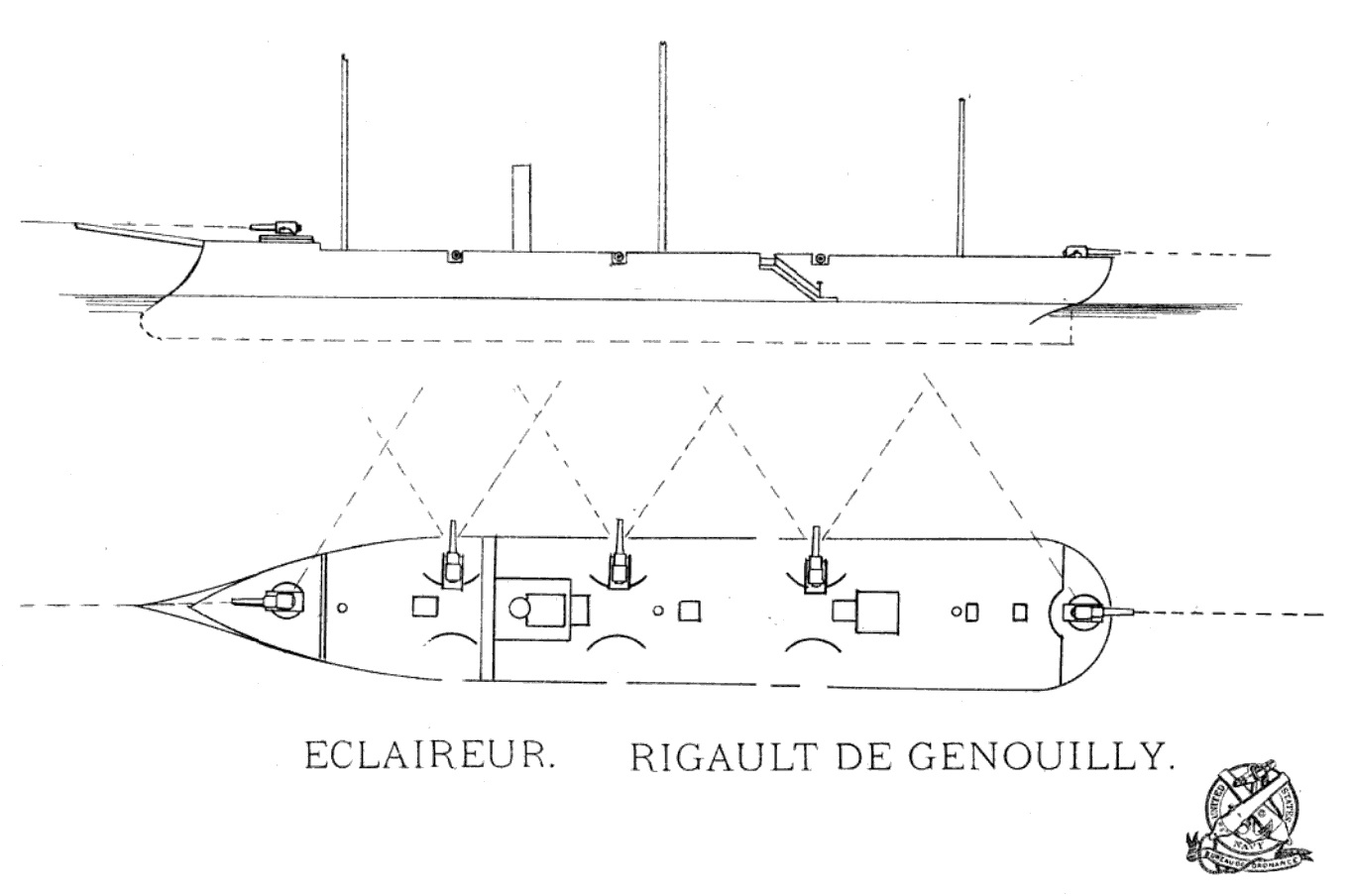
Plan and profile sketch of the Rigault de Genouilly class

The ships of the Rigault de Genouilly class were 71.9 m (235 ft 11 in) long at the waterline and 73.8 metres (242 ft 2 in) long between perpendiculars. They had a beam of 10.8 m (35 ft 5 in) and an average draft of 4.7 m (15 ft 5 in), which increased to 5.25 m (17 ft 3 in) aft. They displaced 1,769 t (1,741 long tons; 1,950 short tons) as designed. They were wooden-hulled vessels that incorporated iron deck beams for increased strength. The ships had a ram bow and an overhanging stern. Their crew amounted to 195 officers and enlisted men.

The ships' propulsion system consisted of a single compound steam engine driving a screw propeller. Steam was provided by six coal-burning fire-tube boilers that were ducted into a single funnel placed amidships. Their machinery was rated to produce 500 nominal horsepower and 2,000 indicated horsepower (1,500 kW) for a top speed of 15 knots (28 km/h; 17 mph). On her trials, Éclaireur reached 2,436 ihp (1,817 kW), though she did not exceed her design speed. Coal storage amounted to 194 t (191 long tons; 214 short tons). At a more economical speed of 10 knots (19 km/h; 12 mph), the ships could steam for 3,130 nautical miles (5,800 km; 3,600 mi). They had a full ship rig to supplement her steam engine on long voyages overseas.

The ships were armed with a main battery of eight 138.6 mm (5.46 in) M1870M 21.3-caliber guns, all placed in single pivot mounts. One was placed atop the forecastle as a chase gun, and it was offset to starboard so that its firing arc directly ahead was not blocked by the bowsprit and rigging. One gun was on the stern, and the remainder were placed in an amidships battery on the upper deck, three guns per broadside. A pair of 37 mm (1.5 in) Hotchkiss revolver cannon provided close-range defense against torpedo boats. They also carried four 86.5 mm (3.41 in) bronze cannon that could be sent ashore with a landing party or used to arm the ship's boats.

=== Modifications ===
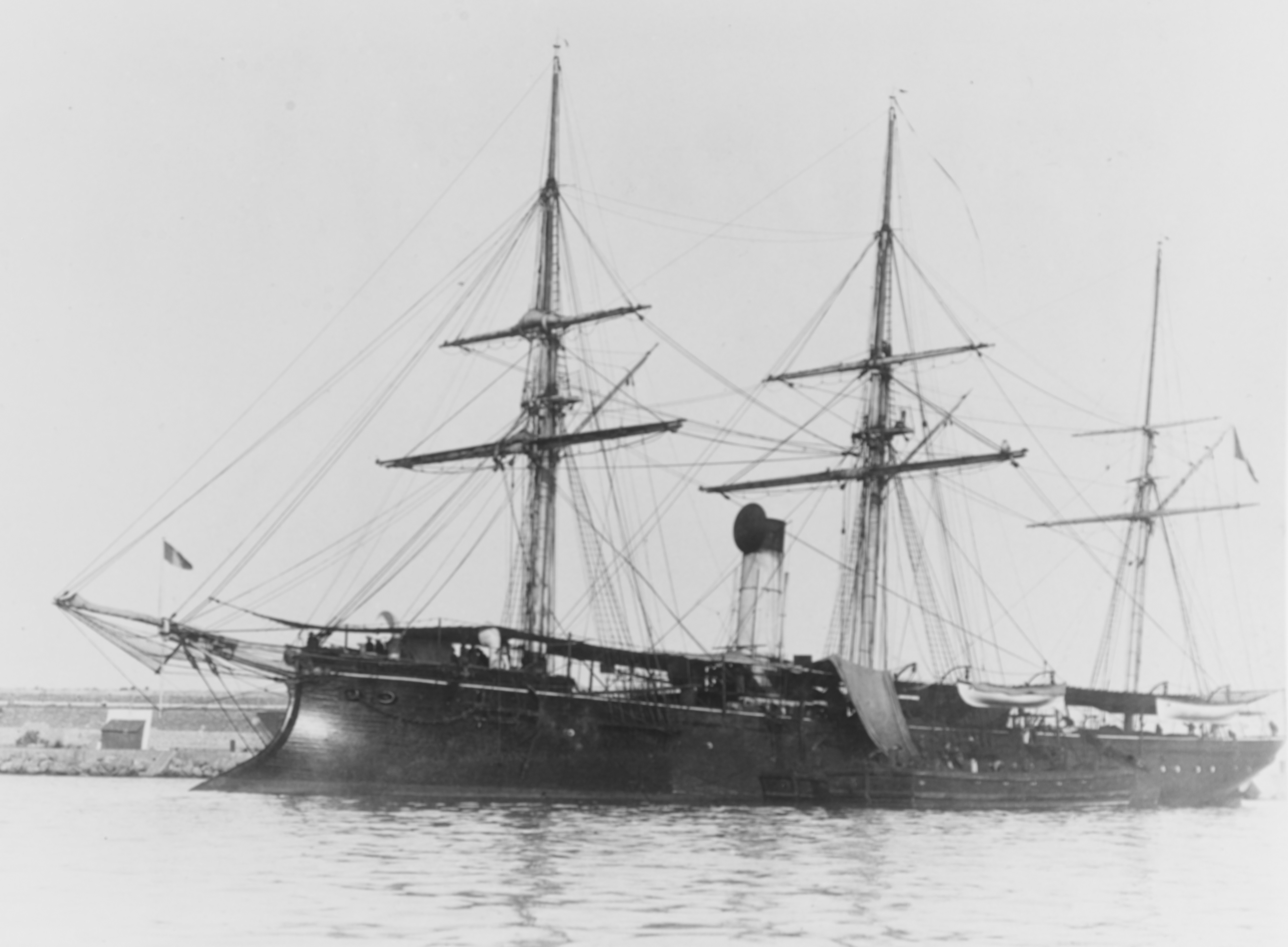
Éclaireur coaling, date unknown

Both ships underwent a series of modifications throughout their careers. In 1883, Rigault de Geouilly and Éclaireur received additional 37 mm Hotchkiss, three and two guns, respectively. In 1886–1889, Rigault de Genouilly had her boilers replaced with eight water-tube Belleville boilers, and she had another three 37 mm guns added, for a total of eight. In 1888, Éclaireur had her funnel casings raised, and in 1896–1897, she was re-boilered like her sister, and she had a new, larger funnel installed. By that time, both ships had had a single 65 mm (2.6 in) gun installed. At some point during their careers, their rigging was reduced to a barque plan.

== Ships ==
Construction data
Name	Laid down	Launched	Completed	Shipyard
Rigault de Genouilly	31 July 1873	19 September 1876	15 June 1878	Arsenal de Brest, Brest
Éclaireur	5 May 1874	30 August 1878	15 November 1878	Arsenal de Toulon, Toulon
N	Allocated to 1876 budget but never begun			

== Service history ==
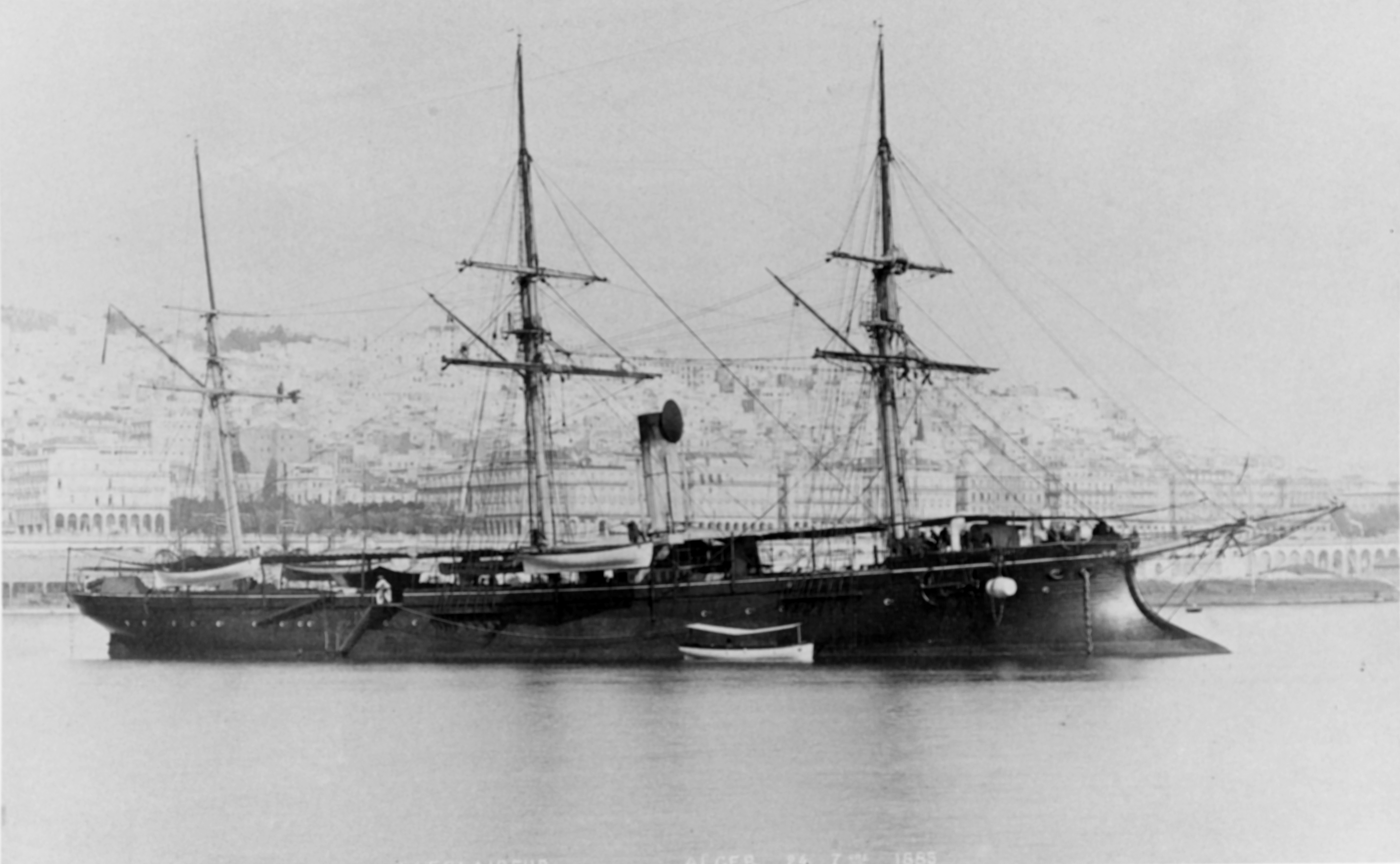
Éclaireur in Algiers after returning from East Asia
