= French cruiser Rigault de Genouilly =

French naval vessel (c. 1870s)

- Rigault de Genouilly

History

France
- Name: Rigault de Genouilly
- Laid down: 31 July 1873
- Launched: 19 September 1876
- Commissioned: 15 June 1878
- Decommissioned: 1899
- Stricken: 3 February 1899
- Fate: Purportedly sold, 14 June 1919

General characteristics
- Class & type: Rigault de Genouilly-class cruiser
- Displacement: 1,769 t (1,741 long tons; 1,950 short tons)
- Length: 71.9 m (235 ft 11 in) lwl
- Beam: 10.8 m (35 ft 5 in)
- Draft: 4.7 m (15 ft 5 in)
- Installed power: 6 × fire-tube boilers; 2,000 ihp (1,500 kW)
- Propulsion: 1 × compound steam engine; 1 × screw propeller
- Sail plan: Full ship rig
- Speed: 15 knots (28 km/h; 17 mph)
- Range: 3,130 nmi (5,800 km; 3,600 mi) at 10 knots (19 km/h; 12 mph)
- Complement: 195
- Armament: 8 × 138.6 mm (5.46 in) guns; 2 × 37 mm (1.5 in) Hotchkiss revolver cannon

Rigault de Genouilly was the lead ship of the Rigault de Genouilly class of unprotected cruisers built for the French Navy in the 1870s. The ships were intended to fill multiple roles, including as scouts for the French fleet, and to patrol the French colonial empire; as such, they were given a high top speed of 15 knots (28 km/h; 17 mph) and were optimized to use their sailing rig for long voyages abroad. They were armed with a main battery of eight 138.6 mm (5.46 in) guns. Rigault de Genouilly was built between 1873 and 1878, but she was initially kept in reserve until 1882 for a cruise in the Antilles. Two years later, she was sent to strengthen French naval forces in Southeast Asia during the Tonkin Campaign, which led to the Sino-French War. She participated in blockades of Formosa and the Yangtze but saw no combat during the war. After returning to France, Rigault de Genouilly was modernized and then spent the 1890s operating in home waters, and later in the cruiser division that patrolled the Atlantic. She was renamed Amiral Rigault de Genouilly in 1895, and she was still operating in the Atlantic in 1898, when she observed the Spanish–American War in Cuba. The ship was decommissioned in early 1899 and struck from the naval register shortly thereafter. She remained in the navy's inventory until at least 1919, when she was sold according to navy records, though records noting her sale listing exist until 1922.

== Design ==
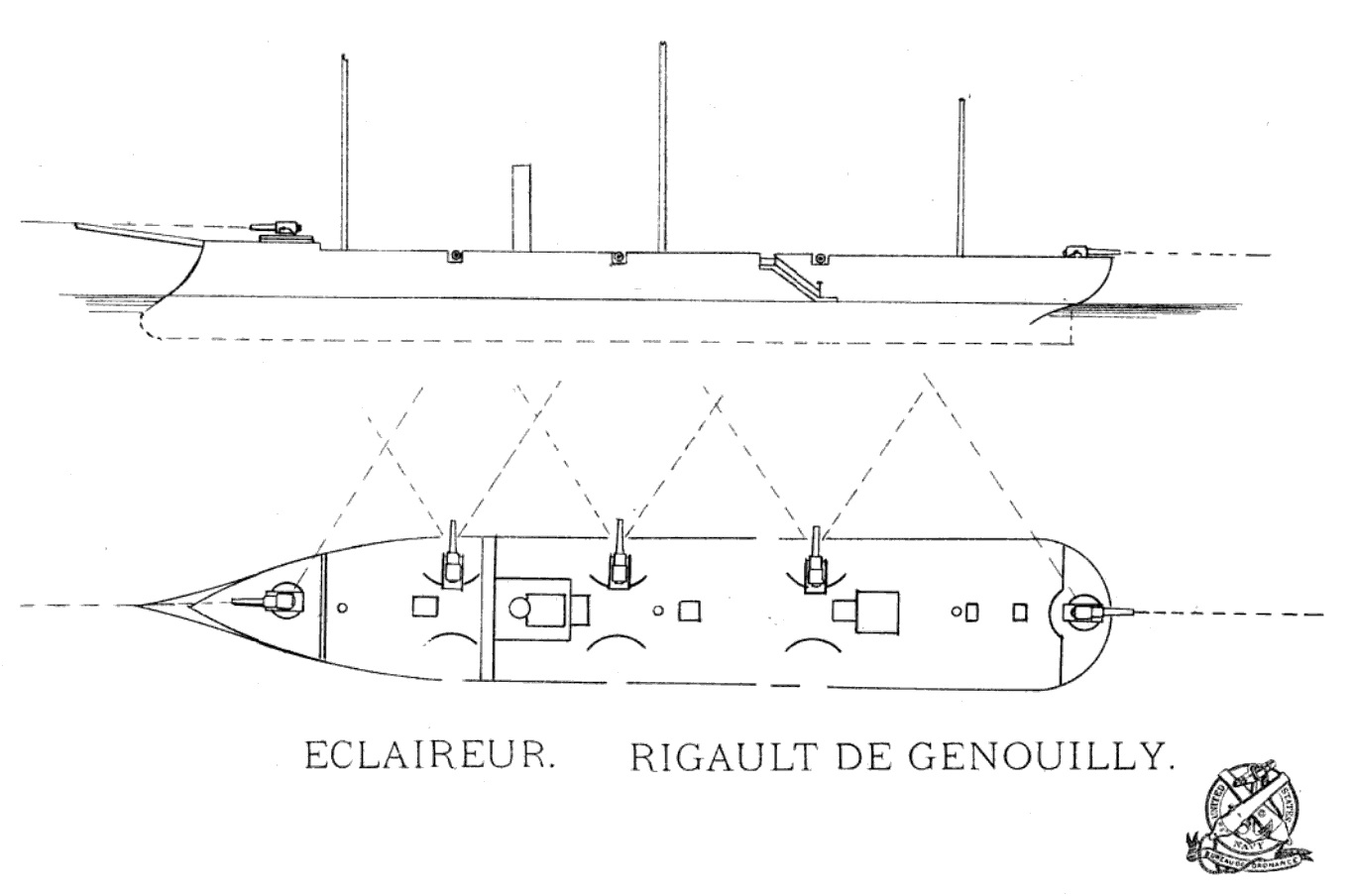
Plan and profile sketch of the Rigault de Genouilly class

The two ships of the Rigault de Genouilly class were ordered under the auspices of the naval plan of 1872, which was laid out to modernize the French Navy in the aftermath of the Franco-Prussian War of 1870–1871. The plan called for large numbers of cruisers of three different sizes: first-, second-, and third-class cruisers, the bulk of which were to be smaller and cheaper second- and third-class vessels. The third-class unprotected cruisers were to fulfill multiple functions, including fleet scouts in home waters and as patrol vessels for the French colonial empire abroad. These new ships required high speed and good sailing qualities, though a powerful armament was not needed. The design for the ships was drawn up by Arthur Bienaymé in 1872–1873.

Rigault de Genouilly was 71.9 m (235 ft 11 in) long at the waterline, with a beam of 10.8 m (35 ft 5 in) and an average draft of 4.7 m (15 ft 5 in). She displaced 1,769 t (1,741 long tons; 1,950 short tons) as designed. The ship had a ram bow and an overhanging stern. Her crew amounted to 195 officers and enlisted men. The ship's propulsion system consisted of a single compound steam engine driving a screw propeller. Steam was provided by six coal-burning fire-tube boilers that were ducted into a single funnel placed amidships. Her machinery was rated to produce 2,000 indicated horsepower (1,500 kW) for a top speed of 15 knots (28 km/h; 17 mph). At a more economical speed of 10 knots (19 km/h; 12 mph), the ship could steam for 3,130 nautical miles (5,800 km; 3,600 mi). She had a full ship rig to supplement her steam engine on long voyages overseas.

The ship was armed with a main battery of eight 138.6 mm (5.46 in) M1870M 21.3-caliber guns. One was placed atop the forecastle as a chase gun, one was on the stern, and the remainder were placed in an amidships battery on the upper deck, three guns per broadside. A pair of 37 mm (1.5 in) Hotchkiss revolver cannon provided close-range defense against torpedo boats. She also carried four 86.5 mm (3.41 in) bronze cannon that could be sent ashore with a landing party or used to arm the ship's boats.

=== Modifications ===
Rigault de Genouilly received a series of alterations throughout her career. In 1883, three more 37 mm Hotchkiss guns were installed. She underwent a more significant modification in 1886–1889. Three more 37 mm gun were added, bringing the total to eight. She also received eight Belleville boilers of the water-tube type. A new, larger funnel was installed in place of the original funnel. By 1897, she also had one 65 mm (2.6 in) gun installed. At some point during her career, her rigging was reduced to a barque plan.

== Service history ==
Rigault de Genouilly in the late 1870s

Rigault de Genouilly was laid down at the Arsenal de Brest shipyard in Brest, France, on 31 July 1873. She was launched on 19 September 1876, and was commissioned to begin sea trials on 15 June 1878. These were completed in early November, and on the 8th she was reduced to the 3rd category of reserve at Brest. She was then decommissioned on 1 December. On 10 March 1882, she was recommissioned for a deployment to the Antilles. At that time, she was joined there by the old screw frigate Magicienne, the cruiser Fabert, and the aviso Chasseur.

By 1884, Rigault de Genouilly had been transferred to the Levant station. As the tensions between France and Qing China over the former's intervention in Vietnam during the Tonkin campaign escalated into the Sino-French War in mid-1884, the French began sending forces to strengthen their position in East Asia. In October that year, Rigault de Genouilly arrived in the region. By then, the Far East Squadron, commanded by Rear Admiral Amédée Courbet, that time, also included the ironclad warships La Galissonnière (the flagship) and Triomphante, the unprotected cruisers Duguay-Trouin, Villars, D'Estaing, Volta, Nielly, and Champlain, and the gunboat Lutin. While at Keelung in November, the ship suffered a boiler explosion that killed thirteen men.

Rigault de Genouilly joined the blockade of Formosa; the cruisers committed to the blockade included her sister Éclaireur, and Villars, Champlain, Lapérouse, and D'Estaing. The ships were based at Tainan, toward the southern end of the island. In March, Courbet sent Rigault de Genouilly, Nielly, Champlain, Lapérouse, and the gunboat Vipère to blockade the mouth of the Yangtze river on mainland China. The French blockade effort, which included other ports, proved to be effective at interrupting the movement of rice crops from southern China north. By this time, secret negotiations between French and Chinese representatives had already begun, as both countries were losing patience with the costly war, and in April, an agreement was reached that was formally signed on 9 June, ending the war. After the war, as the French began to draw down their naval forces in East Asia, Rigault de Genouilly was detached to return to the Levant station. She cruised in the eastern Mediterranean from 1885 into 1886. As of March 1886, the ships on patrol in the region included Rigault de Genouilly, the cruiser Sané, the screw frigate Vénus, and the gunboat Météore.

The ship was taken out of service later in 1886 for a reconstruction of her propulsion system; work lasted into 1889. The following year, Rigault de Genouilly was stationed at Brest, along with the protected cruiser Sfax and the unprotected cruiser Primauguet. The three cruisers were mobilized on 20 June to take part in the fleet maneuvers held that year. Rigault de Genouilly was assigned to the 4th Division of the 2nd Squadron of the Mediterranean Fleet, along with the ironclads Bayard, Vauban, and Duguesclin. The ships concentrated off Oran, French Algeria on 22 June and then proceeded to Brest, arriving there on 2 July for combined operations with the ships of the Northern Squadron. The exercises began four days later and concluded on 25 July, and during part of the maneuvers, Rigault de Genouilly and Primauguet represented the hostile fleet. In 1891, the ship was assigned to the Flying Division of the Atlantic.

By 1893, Rigault de Genouilly had joined the Atlantic squadron, which also included the cruisers Naïade and Nielly. In September, the three ships visited Boston in the United States. The three ships continued to cruise together the following year. That year, she and Naïade embarked on a training cruise to Martinique in the Caribbean Sea and then cruised off Newfoundland. They then met Nielly at Saint Pierre Island. On 25 March 1895, the ship was renamed Amiral Rigault de Genouilly. The following year, she replaced the cruiser Roland on the North American station after it was discovered that the ship that was originally to have replaced Roland—Éclaireur—was badly deteriorated boilers and could not be sent. Rigault de Genouilly remained on the station the following year, serving alongside the cruiser Dubourdieu, the station flagship. The ship was present in Santiago de Cuba in May 1898 during the Spanish–American War, when the city's coastal defenses were bombarded by a squadron of United States ships; errant American fire fell into the harbor, and Amiral Rigault de Genouilly was struck in her rigging and her funnel. The ship's service on the Atlantic station came to an end in early 1899, when Sfax arrived to take her place in the unit. By that time, Amiral Rigault de Genouilly had been cruising in the West Indies.

She was struck from the naval register on 3 February 1899 and was renamed Rumengol later that year. She was then converted into a coal storage hulk and used at Brest into 1914. She was condemned on 16 June 1914 but lay at Landévennec during World War I; after the United States entered the war in 1917, she was used as a depot ship for the US naval forces stationed at Brest. According to French naval records, she was sold on 14 June 1919, but records listing her for sale at Brest existed as late as 1922.
