= French cruiser Cassini =

- Cassini, c. 1901

History

France
- Name: Cassini
- Launched: 5 June 1894

General characteristics
- Class & type: D'Iberville-class cruiser
- Displacement: 970 long tons (990 t)
- Length: 80 m (262 ft 6 in) pp
- Beam: 8.08 to 8.2 m (26 ft 6 in to 26 ft 11 in)
- Draft: 3.45 m (11 ft 4 in)
- Installed power: 8 × water-tube boilers; 5,000 indicated horsepower (3,700 kW)
- Propulsion: 2 × quadruple-expansion steam engines; 2 × screw propellers
- Range: 6,000 nmi (11,000 km; 6,900 mi) at 10 knots (19 km/h; 12 mph)
- Complement: 140–143
- Armament: 1 × 100 mm (3.9 in) gun; 3 × 9-pounder; 6–7 × 47 mm (1.9 in) Hotchkiss guns; 3 × 450 mm (17.7 in) torpedo tubes
- Armor: Deck: 20 to 40 mm (0.79 to 1.57 in); Conning tower: 40 mm

Cassini was the second member of the D'Iberville class of torpedo cruisers built for the French Navy in the 1890s. The class is also sometimes classified as torpedo gunboats or torpedo avisos. The D'Iberville-class ships were a development of earlier torpedo cruisers, with the chief improvement being a significantly higher speed. Cassini was armed with three 450 mm (17.7 in) torpedo tubes and a single 100 mm (3.9 in) gun as her primary offensive armament.

== Design ==
Plan and profile drawing of the D'Iberville class

In the early 1880s, the French Navy began building a series of torpedo cruisers to make use of the new, self-propelled Whitehead torpedo. The first classes of these vessels, the Condor and Wattignies classes, were relatively large vessels. Two further classes, the Bombe and Lévrier classes, were significantly smaller ships. The three vessels of the D'Iberville class marked a return to larger vessels, with greatly increased speed compared to their predecessors. All of these ships have been alternatively called torpedo cruisers, torpedo gunboats, or torpedo avisos.

Cassini was 80 m (262 ft 6 in) long between perpendiculars, with a beam of 8.08 to 8.2 m (26 ft 6 in to 26 ft 11 in) and a draft of 3.45 m (11 ft 4 in). She displaced 970 long tons (990 t). Her crew varied from 140 to 143 officers and enlisted men over the course of her career. The ship's propulsion system consisted of a pair of quadruple-expansion steam engines driving two screw propellers. Steam was provided by eight coal-burning water-tube boilers that were ducted into two funnels. Her machinery was rated to produce 5,000 indicated horsepower (3,700 kW) for a top speed of 21.5 to 22 knots (39.8 to 40.7 km/h; 24.7 to 25.3 mph). She had a cruising radius of 6,000 nautical miles (11,000 km; 6,900 mi) at 10 knots (19 km/h; 12 mph).

The ship was armed with a main battery of one 100 mm (3.9 in) gun in a pivot mount forward. For close-range defense against torpedo boats, she carried three 65 mm (2.6 in) 9-pounder quick-firing guns and six or seven 47 mm (1.9 in) 3-pounder Hotchkiss guns, all in individual mounts. She was also armed with three 450 mm (17.7 in) torpedo tubes in her hull above the waterline. Armor protection consisted of a curved armor deck that was 20 mm (0.8 in) thick, along with same thickness of plating on the conning tower.

== Service history ==
=== Construction – 1902 ===
Cassini was built by the Société Nouvelle des Forges et Chantiers de la Méditerranée shipyard in La Seyne-sur-Mer; her keel was laid down in November 1892 and she was launched on 5 June 1894. The ship was to have been completed that year, but delays conducting sea trials with other vessels pushed Cassini's trials back as well. These problems were largely related to the extensive nature of French trials, compared to foreign navies, and the recent adoption of new water-tube boilers in many French vessels, which required changes to boiler room regulations. Cassini was completed the following year, and during her sea trials, she reached a top speed of 21.37 knots (39.58 km/h; 24.59 mph). The ship struck a floating object while conducting her 24-hour endurance test, which broke one of her screw blades and necessitated repairs before her final tests could be completed.

Cassini was assigned to the cruiser division of the Northern Squadron in 1897, along with a pair of armored cruisers, the protected cruiser Friant, the torpedo cruiser Epervier, and two torpedo gunboats. She remained in the unit the following year. The ship initially remained in the unit in 1899, and she took part in the annual maneuvers in July and August that year. Later that year, she was withdrawn from service to have one of her torpedo tubes removed. After returning to service in 1900, Cassini returned to the Northern Squadron, where she remained through 1901. That year, the annual fleet maneuvers were conducted from 3 to 28 July. During the exercises, the Northern Squadron steamed south for joint maneuvers with the Mediterranean Squadron. The Northern Squadron ships formed part of the hostile force, and as it was entering the Mediterranean from the Atlantic, represented a German squadron attempting to meet its Italian allies. In August and September, the Northern Squadron conducted amphibious assault exercises. On 28 August, they escorted a group of troop ships from Brest to La Rochelle. The ships conducted a simulated bombardment of the port, neutralized the coastal defenses, and put some 6,000 men ashore.

Cassini remained in the unit through 1902. She took part in exercises with submarines in January that year, which were held off Cherbourg. Cassini and the coastal defense ships Bouvines and Amiral Tréhouart were subjected to a simulated attack by the submarines Morse, Narval, Triton, Espadon, and Français. Cassini was able to evade an attack from Morse, but in doing so, came within range of Français, and was judged to have been sunk; both coastal defense ships were also ruled to have been destroyed by the submarines. During the 1902 fleet maneuvers, which began on 7 July, the Northern Squadron attempted to force a passage through the Strait of Gibraltar. The squadron was unable to effect the passing unobserved by the Mediterranean Squadron's cruisers, but the Northern Squadron commander was able to shake his pursuers long enough to prevent them from intercepting his force before the end of the exercises on 15 July. Further maneuvers with the combined fleet took place, including a simulated battle where Cassini and the other ships of the Northern Squadron represented the British Mediterranean Fleet; the exercises concluded on 5 August.

=== 1903–1917 ===
The ship was still part of the Northern Squadron in 1903; that year, the unit was kept in commission for six months of the year for training exercises. The squadron at that time consisted of the pre-dreadnought battleships Masséna and Bouvet, four coastal defense ships, the armored cruisers Jeanne d'Arc and Marseillaise, the protected cruiser Guichen, and six destroyers. On 2 April, Cassini and several other vessels steamed to Cherbourg, where they welcomed a visit from the British King George V aboard his royal yacht Victoria and Albert three days later. Cassini remained in the unit through 1905. She took part in the fleet maneuvers for 1906, which began on 6 July with the concentration of the Northern and Mediterranean Squadrons in Algiers in French Algeria. The maneuvers were conducted in the western Mediterranean, alternating between ports in French North Africa and Toulon and Marseille, France, and concluding on 4 August. She was present for the 1907 fleet maneuvers, which again saw the Northern and Mediterranean Squadrons unite for large-scale operations held off the coast of French Morocco and in the western Mediterranean. The exercises consisted of two phases and began on 2 July and concluded on 20 July.

In July 1908, Cassini joined a flotilla of vessels that included the new pre-dreadnought battleship Vérité for a tour of the Baltic Sea and a visit to Russia. President Armand Fallières traveled aboard Vérité for the trip, and Cassini formed part of the escort, which also included the armored cruiser Dupetit-Thouars and the destroyers Baliste and Arquebuse. The ships cruised north to Dunkirk, where Fallières embarked on Vérité, and then continued on into the Baltic, stopping in Copenhagen, Denmark and Stockholm, Sweden. From there, the ships steamed to Reval, where Czar Nicholas II of Russia visited the ships. The squadron arrived back in Brest on 6 August. Cassini was converted into a minelayer in 1913. She had a capacity of 97 naval mines.

Cassini was assigned to the Groupe de mouilleurs de mines (Minelayer Group) by the start of World War I in August 1914, along with her similarly converted sister ship Casabianca and the converted minelayer La Hire. Cassini initially operated with the rest of the fleet covering the troopship convoys that carried elements of the French Army from French North Africa to Europe until 23 September, when she was detached to escort the pre-dreadnought Saint Louis to Port Said, Egypt. From then through mid-1915, Cassini patrolled the Strait of Otranto and off Corfu at the southern end of the Adriatic Sea with the rest of the main French fleet. Cassini was torpedoed and sunk by a submarine in the Strait of Bonifacio on 20 February 1917.
