= Narwhal (disambiguation) =

The narwhal is a species of whale with a distinctive long tusk.

Narwhal may also refer to:

- Narwhal (whaling vessel), a whaling ship used between 1883 and 1907
- HMS Narwhal, several ships of the British Royal Navy
- USS Narwhal, several US Navy ships
- Narwhal-class submarine, US submarines
- Project Narwhal, a computer program used in Barack Obama's 2012 presidential campaign
- The Narwhal, Canadian environmental magazine
- KNDS Narwhal, a French naval gun
- MTS Narwhal, a Czech cruise missile
- Ubuntu 11.04 (Natty Narwhal), a Linux distribution release

== See also ==
- Narwal (disambiguation)
- Narval (disambiguation)
- Narwhale (Dungeons & Dragons)
