= French cruiser D'Iberville =

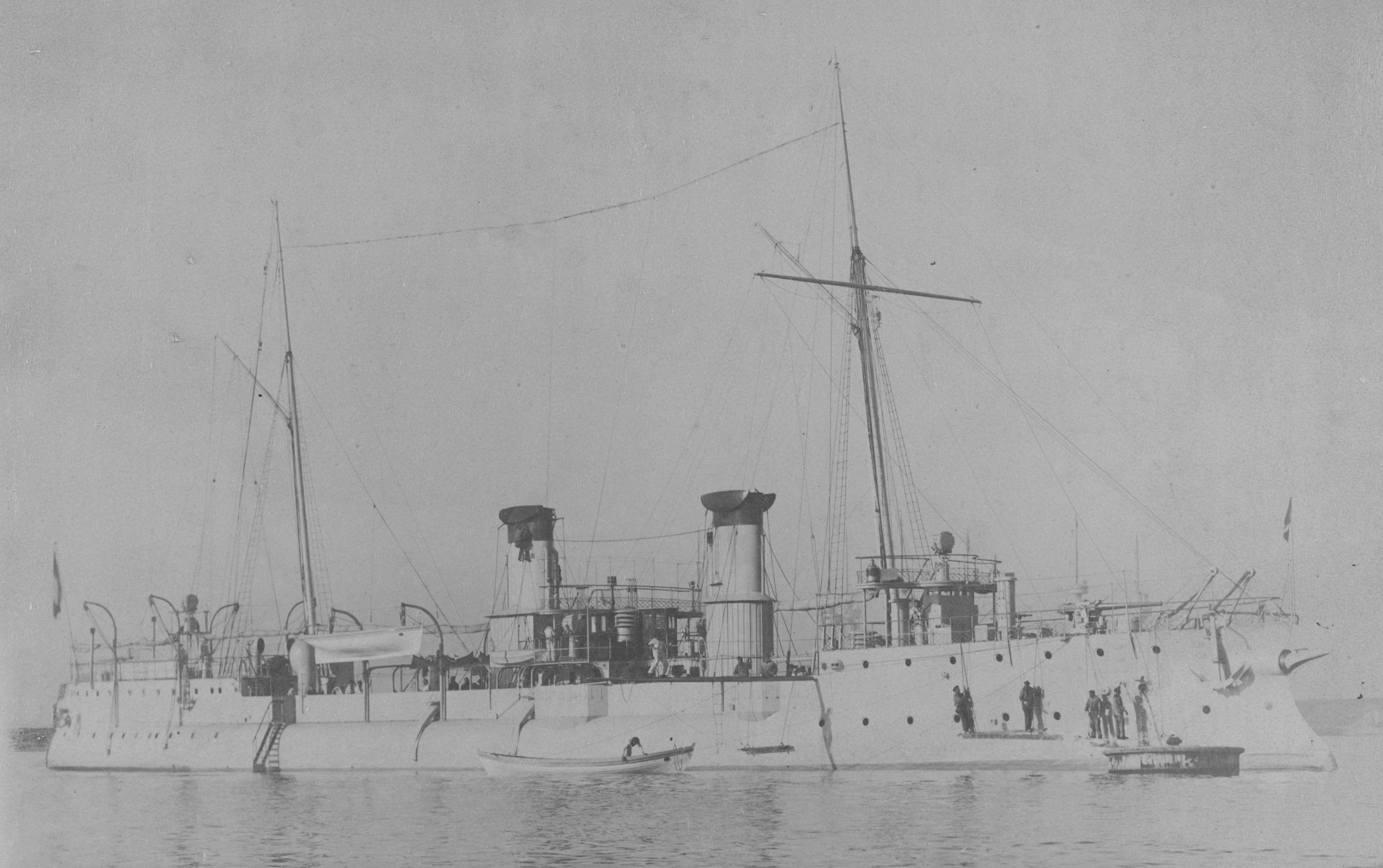
- D'Iberville, early in her career, c. 1895–1896

History

France
- Name: D'Iberville
- Builder: Chantiers de la Loire
- Laid down: August 1891
- Launched: 11 September 1892
- Commissioned: 1894
- Stricken: July 1919
- Fate: Broken up, 1920

General characteristics
- Class & type: D'Iberville-class cruiser
- Displacement: 952 long tons (967 t)
- Length: 80 m (262 ft 6 in) pp
- Beam: 8.08 to 8.2 m (26 ft 6 in to 26 ft 11 in)
- Draft: 3.45 m (11 ft 4 in)
- Installed power: 8 × water-tube boilers; 5,000 indicated horsepower (3,700 kW)
- Propulsion: 2 × quadruple-expansion steam engines; 2 × screw propellers
- Range: 6,000 nmi (11,000 km; 6,900 mi) at 10 knots (19 km/h; 12 mph)
- Complement: 140–143
- Armament: 1 × 100 mm (3.9 in) gun; 3 × 9-pounder; 6–7 × 47 mm (1.9 in) Hotchkiss guns; 6 × 450 mm (17.7 in) torpedo tubes
- Armor: Deck: 20 to 40 mm (0.79 to 1.57 in); Conning tower: 40 mm

D'Iberville was the lead ship of the D'Iberville class of torpedo cruisers built for the French Navy in the 1890s. The class is also sometimes classified as torpedo gunboats or torpedo avisos. The D'Iberville-class ships were a development of earlier torpedo cruisers, with the chief improvement being a significantly higher speed. D'Iberville was armed with six 450 mm (17.7 in) torpedo tubes and a single 100 mm (3.9 in) gun as her primary offensive armament, though she had all of her torpedo tubes removed in 1896, just two years after entering service.

D'Iberville had a fairly limited career, serving with the Mediterranean Squadron from 1895 to 1897. During this time, her chief activities consisted of annual fleet maneuvers conducted every summer. By 1903, the ship lay at Toulon awaiting repairs to her boilers, which had proved troublesome in service. The ship was reactivated for a deployment to French Indochina in Southeast Asia by 1911. She was still on station there at the start of World War I in August 1914, and she was sent to patrol for German vessels known to be in the area. She was present for the Battle of Penang in October 1914, where the German light cruiser SMS Emden raided the port, sank the Russian protected cruiser Zhemchug, and fled before D'Iberville or the other warships in the harbor could effectively engage the German vessel. D'Iberville was later transferred to French Algeria, remaining there on patrol duty until 1917. She was ultimately stricken from the naval register in 1919 and sold to ship breakers in 1920.

== Design ==
Plan and profile drawing of the D'Iberville class

In the early 1880s, the French Navy began building a series of torpedo cruisers to make use of the new, self-propelled Whitehead torpedo. The first classes of these vessels, the Condor and Wattignies classes, were relatively large vessels. Two further classes, the Bombe and Lévrier classes, were significantly smaller ships. The three vessels of the D'Iberville class marked a return to larger vessels, with greatly increased speed compared to their predecessors. All of these ships have been alternatively called torpedo cruisers, torpedo gunboats, or torpedo avisos.

D'Iberville was 80 m (262 ft 6 in) long between perpendiculars, with a beam of 8.08 to 8.2 m (26 ft 6 in to 26 ft 11 in) and a draft of 3.45 m (11 ft 4 in). She displaced 952 long tons (967 t). Her crew varied from 140 to 143 officers and enlisted men over the course of her career. The ship's propulsion system consisted of a pair of quadruple-expansion steam engines driving two screw propellers. Steam was provided by eight coal-burning water-tube boilers that were ducted into two funnels. Her machinery was rated to produce 5,000 indicated horsepower (3,700 kW) for a top speed of 21.5 to 22 knots (39.8 to 40.7 km/h; 24.7 to 25.3 mph). She had a cruising radius of 6,000 nautical miles (11,000 km; 6,900 mi) at 10 knots (19 km/h; 12 mph).

The ship was armed with a main battery of one 100 mm (3.9 in) gun in a pivot mount forward. For close-range defense against torpedo boats, she carried three 65 mm (2.6 in) 9-pounder quick-firing guns and six or seven 47 mm (1.9 in) 3-pounder Hotchkiss guns, all in individual mounts. She was also armed with six 450 mm (17.7 in) torpedo tubes in her hull above the waterline. Armor protection consisted of a curved armor deck that was 20 mm (0.8 in) thick, along with 41 mm (1.6 in) plating on the conning tower.

== Service history ==
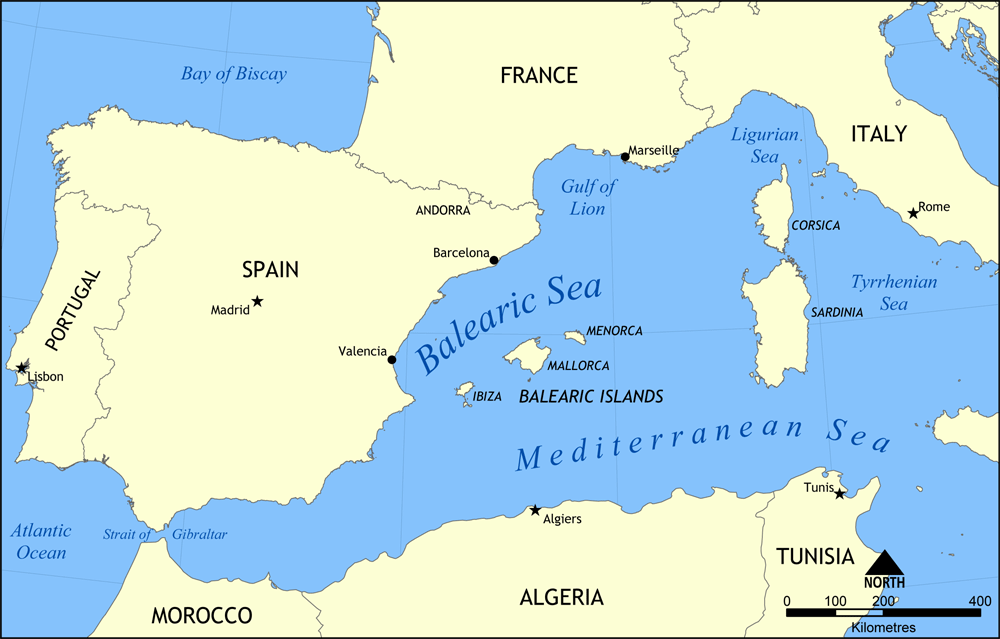
Map of the western Mediterranean, where D'Iberville spent the majority of her peacetime career

D'Iberville was laid down in August 1891 at the Chantiers de la Loire shipyard in Saint-Nazaire. She was launched on 11 September 1892 and was completed in 1894. She completed her sea trials in June and July that year; on speed tests conducted on 21 July, she reached a speed of 21.6 knots (40.0 km/h; 24.9 mph). She served with the Mediterranean Squadron in 1895, and she took part in the fleet maneuvers that year, which began on 1 July and concluded on the 27th. She was assigned to "Fleet C", which represented the hostile Italian fleet, which was tasked with defeating "Fleet A" and "Fleet B". The latter two units represented the French fleet, and they were individually inferior to "Fleet C", but superior when combined.

As a torpedo vessel, D'Iberville proved to be a disappointment, in part due to severe rolling in heavy seas, and by mid-1896, she had had all of her tubes removed and additional Hotchkiss guns were installed in their places. From 6 to 30 July 1896, the ship participated in the annual fleet maneuvers with the rest of the Mediterranean Squadron, serving in the cruiser screen for the 1st Division, along with the armored cruiser Amiral Charner, the protected cruiser Bugeaud, and the torpedo cruiser Wattignies. The ship remained with the cruiser screen for the Mediterranean Fleet in 1897, along with her sister ship Casabianca and several other vessels. She participated in the fleet maneuvers that year, which lasted from 7 to 30 July, and included night maneuvers, fleet defense against torpedo boats, and simulated battle between squadrons of battleships. She remained in the unit the following year.

She was placed in reserve in 1901. By 1903, the ship lay at Toulon, awaiting repairs to her boilers, along with two dozen other major warships with similarly troublesome boilers. D'Iberville had been reactivated by 1911 and sent to French Indochina to serve with the Naval Division of the Far East. At that time, the unit consisted of the armored cruisers Dupleix and Kléber, three destroyers, six torpedo boats, and four submarines, along with a number of smaller vessels.

=== World War I ===
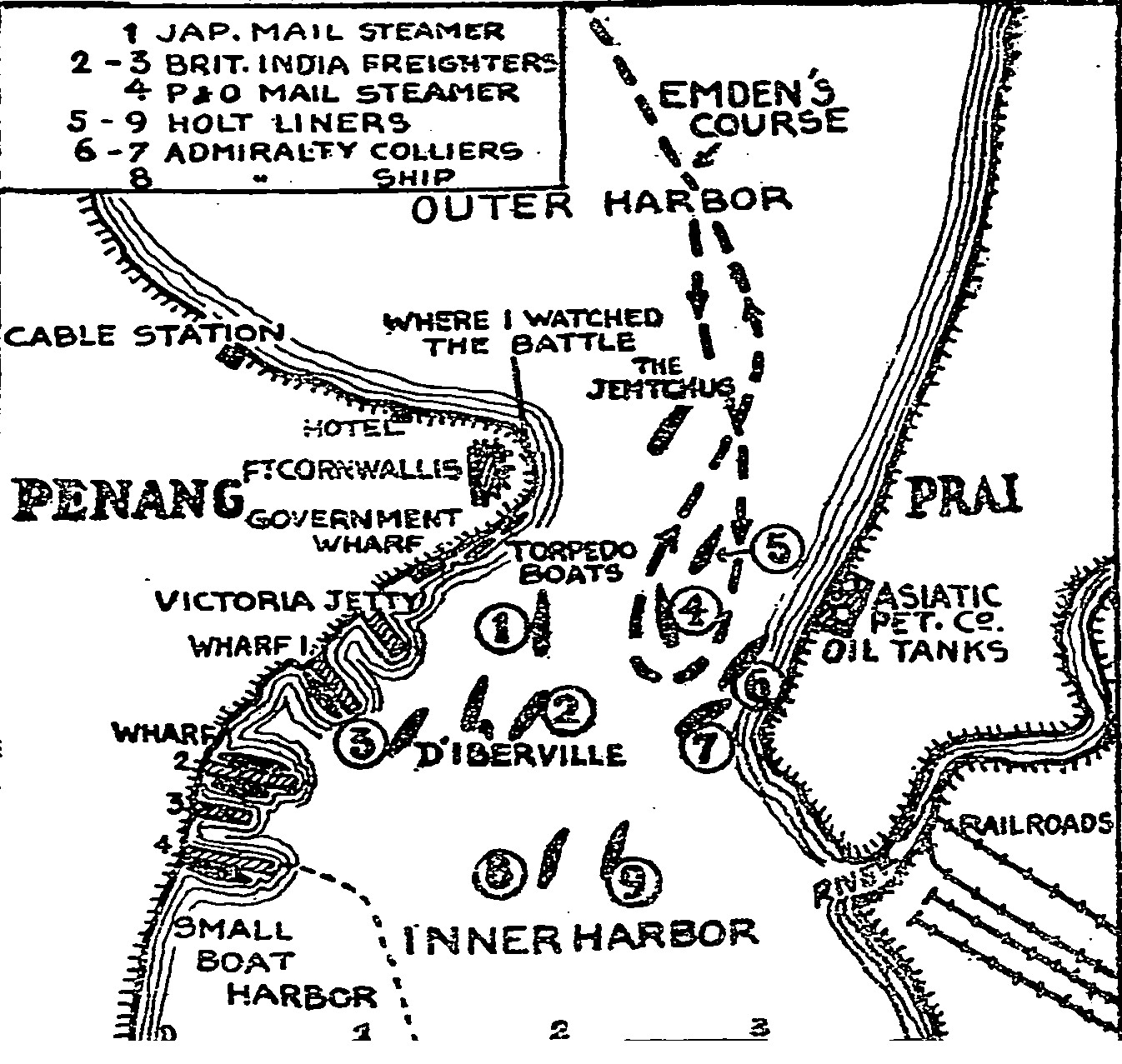
Map showing movements during the Battle of Penang

At the start of World War I in August 1914, D'Iberville was stationed in the Naval Division of the Far East, along with the armored cruisers Montcalm and Dupleix and the destroyers Fronde, Pistolet, and Mousquet. The unit was based in Saigon in French Indochina. D'Iberville and the destroyers were initially sent to patrol the Strait of Malacca while the armored cruisers were sent north to join the search for the German East Asia Squadron. D'Iberville and the destroyers conducted patrols in the strait for the German unprotected cruiser SMS Geier, which was known to be passing through the area at the time; the French ships failed to locate the German vessel. On 12 October, the British light cruiser HMS Yarmouth seized the Greek-flagged merchant vessel SS Pontoporos, which had been captured for use as a collier by the German light cruiser SMS Emden, which had been detached from the East Asia Squadron. Dupleix sent Pontoporos to D'Iberville, which escorted the merchantman to Penang.

D'Iberville and the three destroyers were present in Penang on the night of 27–28 October 1914 along with the Russian protected cruiser Zhemchug, when Emden entered the harbor. The German raider torpedoed and sank Zhemchug in the Battle of Penang. The French destroyers were suffering from boiler problems and none had steam up to get underway when Emden arrived, while D'Iberville had been undergoing repairs to her engines and was similarly immobilized. D'Iberville's gunners fired wildly with the ship's light guns in the darkness and failed to score any hits during the brief action. Her 100 mm guns could not train far enough to engage the German vessel. Emden's commander decided to attack D'Iberville next, but before the Germans opened fire, lookouts spotted a vessel entering the harbor at high speed, and Emden engaged that ship instead. Emden thereafter slipped back out of the harbor, sinking Mousquet in the process, and escaped.

D'Iberville was later transferred back to home waters, where she was assigned to the Algerian Patrol Division. She served with the unit until 1917. She remained on the navy list until July 1919, when she was struck from the register. The vessel was broken up the following year.
