= Q13 =

Q13 may refer to:

- Q13 (New York City bus)
- Ar-Ra'd, the thirteenth surah of the Quran
- French submarine Espadon (1901), a Sirène-class submarine
- HMS Aubrietia (1916), a Q-ship of the Royal Navy
- KCPQ (Fox 13), formerly branded Q13
