= Narowal (disambiguation) =

Narowal is a city in Punjab, Pakistan.

Narowal or Nurowal may refer to:

- Narowal District, a district of Punjab (Pakistan)
  - Narowal Tehsil, a tehsil of district Narowal
  - Narowal Junction railway station, railway station in Pakistan
- Nurowal, a village in India
- Narawala, a village in Sri Lanka

== See also ==
- Narwal (disambiguation)
