= French ship Triton =

At least seventeen ships of the French Navy have borne the name Triton:

== Ships named Triton ==
- Triton (1638), a 30-gun ship of the line
- Triton (1663), a fireship
- Triton (1670), a 48-gun ship of the line
- Mercure (1671), a 30-gun fireship, bore the name during her career
- Brillant (1678), a 40 gun ship of the line, bore the name during her career
- Triton (1697), a 42-gun ship of the line captured by the British in 1702 at the Battle of Vigo Bay, and sold in 1709.
- Triton (1705), a 50-gun ship of the line
- Triton (1730), a 62-gun ship of the line
- Triton (1747), a 64-gun ship of the line
- Triton (1771), a 26-gun frigate
- Triton (1795), a transport
- Triton (1803), a floating battery
- Triton (1811), a transport
- Triton (1823), a Téméraire-class ship of the line launched in 1823 and decommissioned in 1850
- Bayard (1876), a ship of the line transformed into a steamer, bore the name during her career.
- Triton (1901), a Sirène-class submarine launched in 1901 and stricken in 1919.
- Bayard (1919), a tug.
- Bayard (1972), a submarine experimentation ship.

== Notes and references ==
Notes

Bibliography

- Roche, Jean-Michel (2005a). Dictionnaire des bâtiments de la flotte de guerre française de Colbert à nos jours. Vol. 1. Group Retozel-Maury Millau. ISBN 978-2-9525917-0-6. OCLC 165892922.
- Roche, Jean-Michel (2005b). Dictionnaire des bâtiments de la flotte de guerre française de Colbert à nos jours. Vol. 2. Group Retozel-Maury Millau. ISBN 978-2-9525917-0-6. OCLC 165892922.
