= George Baker Leavitt Sr. =

American mariner

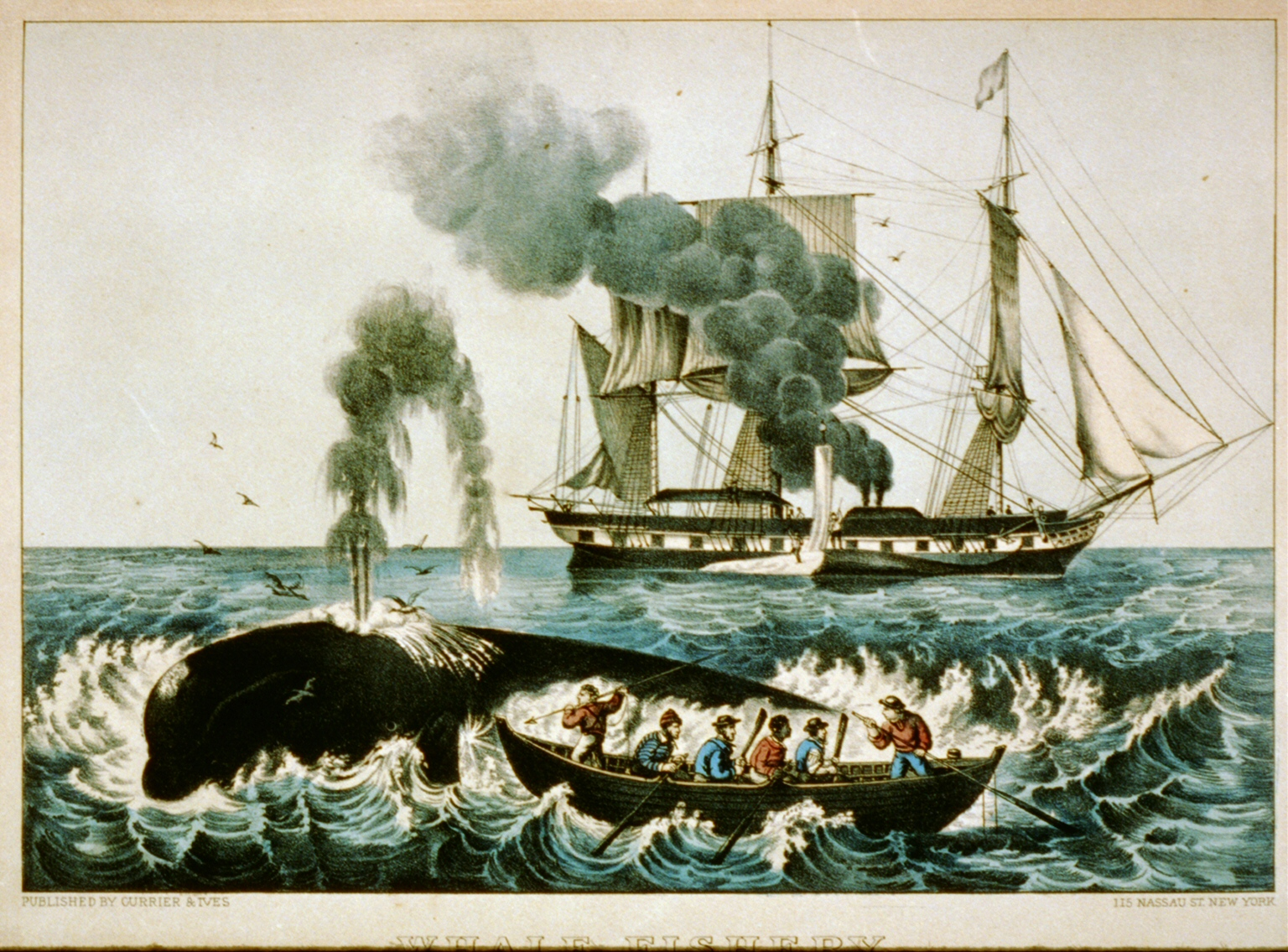
Early New England whalers

Capt. George Baker Leavitt Sr. (1860 – 1925) was a Maine-born mariner who captained several whaling vessels out of New Bedford, Massachusetts. The steam whalers captained by Leavitt were active in the whaling fishery off the Alaska North Slope, where Leavitt met and married an Inupiaq woman. The mariner befriended many early Arctic explorers, whom he replenished with supplies and provided transportation to, as well as assisted in Arctic exploration. Leavitt Island in the Beaufort Sea's Harrison Bay is named for the early New England whaling captain.

== Early life in Maine and beginnings of career ==
George Baker Leavitt was born in Portland, Maine, on June 5, 1860, the son of George Washington Leavitt and his wife Helen E. (Greene) Leavitt, whose family was originally from Virginia. Descendants of one of New Hampshire's earliest settlers, the Leavitt family had lived in Portland since the eighteenth century. Shortly after the birth of his son, George Washington Leavitt was killed in action during the American Civil War. Four years after the conflict ended, his widow remarried Storer S. Knight of Portland, where George Baker Leavitt was raised, along with three children born to his mother by her second husband.

Like other early Maine Yankees, George Baker Leavitt decided to make his living from the sea and embarked on a career aboard whaling ships sailing from the thriving Massachusetts seaport of New Bedford. Leavitt joined the fleet at an early age, and first served in a succession of minor posts such as second mate, before eventually earning the right to captain his own vessel. There followed a succession of whaling ships of which he served as captain, including the Mary D. Hume, the Thrasher, the Grampus, the Balaena, and the steam whalers the Newport and the Narwhal.

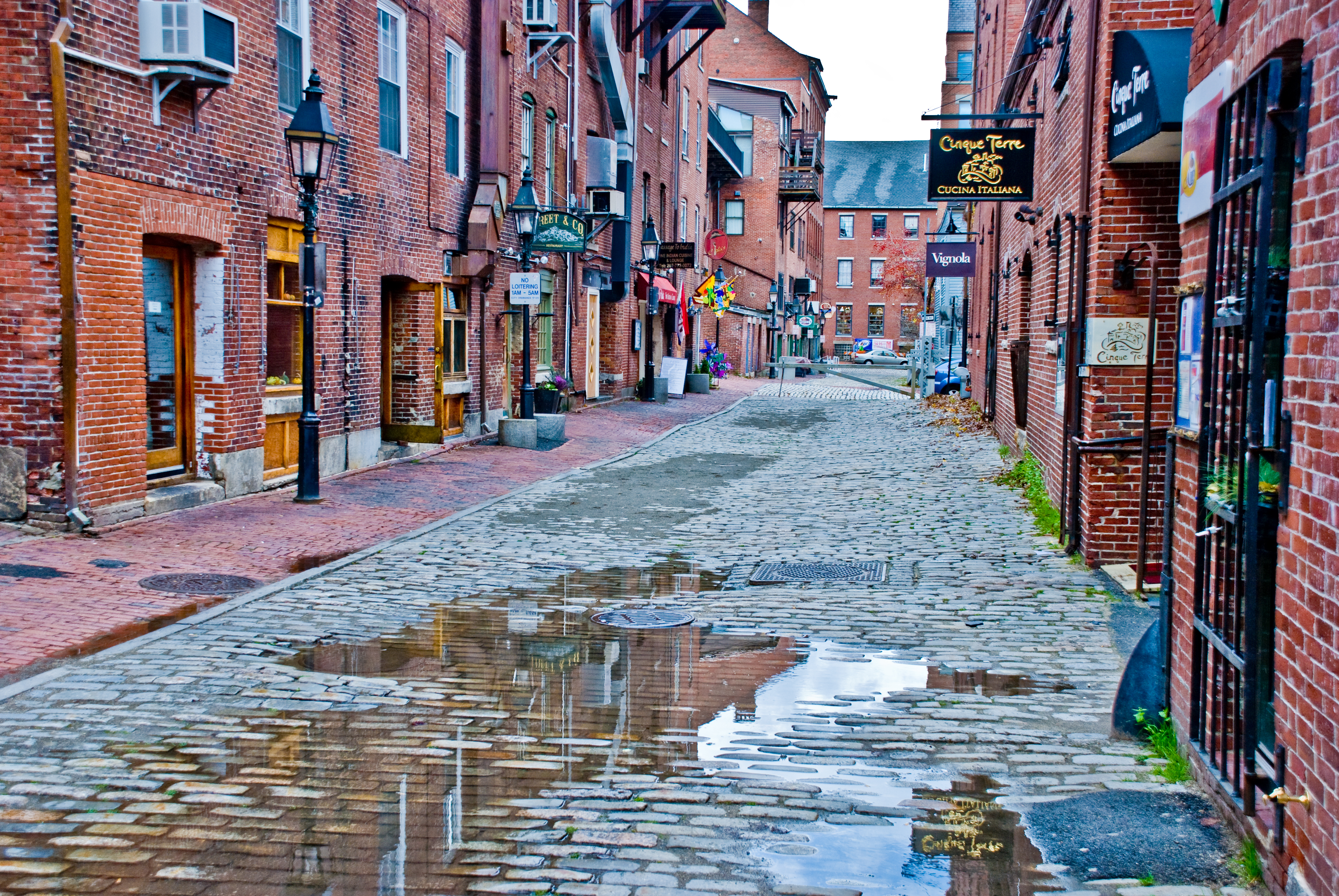
The Old Port, Portland, Maine. The first harbor that Portland native Capt. Leavitt knew

== The whaling fishery ==
Leavitt arrived in the Canadian Arctic in the late nineteenth century as the New England and San Francisco-based whaling fleet pursued their targets into the frozen northern seas. The oil-bearing bones in the heads of bowhead whales were highly sought-after and brought large profits to the whalers. Captains of the whaling ships (first sail, and later steam powered) would leave San Francisco in early summer, then whale in the Beaufort Sea for as long as the season would allow (generally eight or ten weeks) before new ice set in during September. Then they would go into winter quarters at Herschel Island, Canada. By early the next summer, as soon as the ice broke, the whaling vessels would depart the Herschel with their catch from the previous year, which they would transport to San Francisco via the Bering Strait. In San Francisco, the vessels would sell their catch, refit their vessels, then depart again for the north, where they would repeat the exercise all over again.

Early whaling captains and their crews were well paid if the boats netted their prey. In 1907, for instance, George Leavitt and his vessel Narwhal, steam whaler, took some 15 bowhead whales. In such cases, the captain received one-12th of the take; the first mate one 22nd; the second mate one 30th; the third mate one 45th. Other sailors aboard received smaller percentages of the haul, down to the so-called "green hands", who received one 200th. The engineers aboard ship received a straight salary of $120 a month.

The work was immensely tiring and complicated, embracing everything from seamanship to whale hunting (with metal harpoon guns) to complex logistics. In the winter of 1896, the crews of several ships faced starvation as the frozen seas prevented the ships from reprovisioning. "These two vessels were in such desperate straits for food in the fall of 1897", wrote First Lieutenant D. H. Jarvis of the Overland Relief Expedition of 1898, "that it took heroic work to keep them supplied, and Captains Leavitt and McKenna are deserving of great credit for the ways they brought their crews through."

Injuries were common. As captain of the Newport, Leavitt wrote of one of many amputations performed in the fleet – many by himself and other captains. On March 9, 1894, wrote Captain Leavitt, "Both feet, or the best part of both feet, were amputated from a man belonging to the Narwhal [a ship Leavitt later captained]. These feet were taken off well back, the same way as with the other amputations, with the difference that after the foot was cut to the bone, a piece of canvas was put on and the flesh hauled back and the bones then cut off. In this way a flap was formed, and the whole business turned out very well indeed."

== Leavitt's career as captain ==
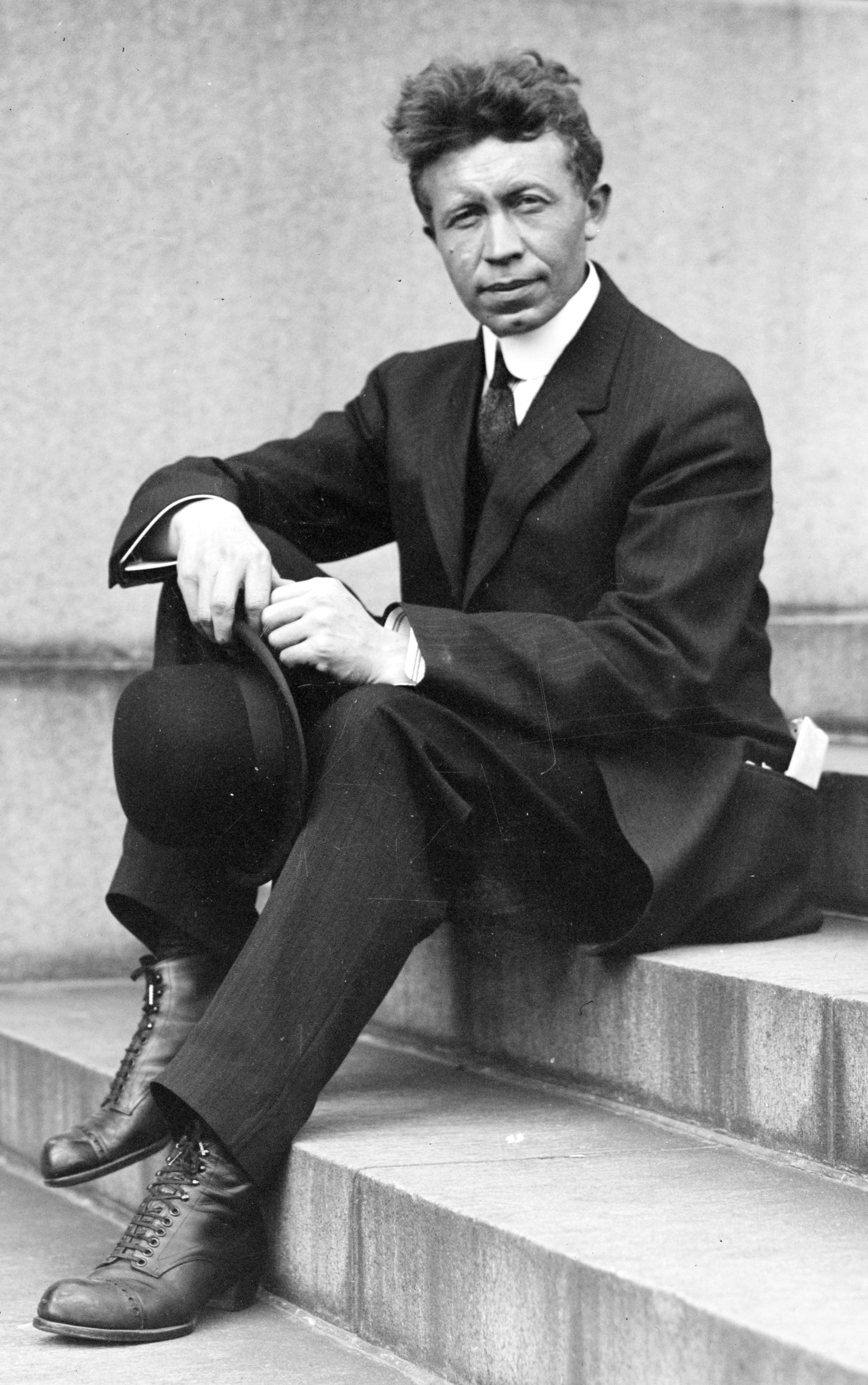
Arctic explorer Vilhjalmur Stefansson, friend and fellow explorer of Captain George Leavitt

It was not work for the faint-hearted. Aside from injuries aboard ship, the ice and frigid waters posed immense risk. During one particularly treacherous summer, it was impossible to make it past Nelson Head before August 14 because the passage was still frozen. "The ice", wrote Leavitt in his log, "was solid all the way across [to Cape Parry]." Many of the early boats, including the schooner Bonanza, became stuck in the ice and were destroyed.

In another horrifying incident, Leavitt and other captains watched as eight whaling ships became trapped in the ice on Alaska's northern coast. "As an eerie postscript to an already chilling bulletin", writes John Taliaferro of the 1898 incident in his In A Far Country, "Captain James McKenna of the Fearless and Captain George Leavitt of the Newport reported that the Navarch [another whaler] had been spotted drifting in the pack ice, twelve miles (19 km) to the north of them."

It was an enormously complicated undertaking. To help him figure out the elements and the topography, Captain Leavitt, like some other early pilots, hired a Native Inuit (Eskimo) guide named Natkusiak (c. 1885–1947), who helped him in his expeditions across the Arctic seas, including his trips to some islands like Norway Island where other whalers had not dared venture.

Natkusiak worked for Leavitt for several years. During this time, when the steam whaler Narwhal was wintering at Herschel Island in 1906–07 with Leavitt as her captain, the Arctic explorer Vilhjalmur Stefansson first met Leavitt and his Native guide. Leavitt and the explorer went on to become fast friends, with Leavitt often offering advice on the area to Stefansson, as well as bringing him supplies from the American Museum of Natural History in New York City. In 1908, Stefansson hired Leavitt's Native guide, who went on to aid the Arctic explorer on his subsequent expeditions.

Leavitt himself proved to be the source of advice and support to the explorer Stefansson, who quotes him often in his journals and calls him 'explorer' as well as 'captain'. The Maine-born mariner, Stefansson noted, was intrepid in his nautical work, often sailing to places beyond the reach of others. "Captain Leavitt had told me that the Narwhal was the only ship of the whaling fleet", Stefansson wrote, "that ever went to Norway Island, but I have heard of others that went within 45 miles (72 km) of it – to Terror Island."

In his journals, Stefansson wrote often of his relationship with the early whaling captain. "Captain George Leavitt of the Narwhal had entertained me aboard his ship in winter quarters at Herschel Island several times during the winter of 1906–1907, and had now brought me a consignment of ammunition, kerosene, alcohol for the preservation of scientific specimens, and various things of that sort, sent North in his care by the American Museum of Natural History."

Nor was Stefansson the only early Arctic explorer who benefited from the counsel of the New England mariner. Ernest de Koven Leffingwell, another early Arctic explorer and cartographer, was often given berth aboard Captain Leavitt's ships as he traveled back and forth to the Arctic region. In 1908, after the explorer's own early vessel The Duchess of Bedford was itself trapped in the Arctic ice and smashed, Capt. Leavitt provided passage for Leffingwell and his party back to San Francisco. As a token of thanks, Leffingwell named the island Narwhal after the name of Leavitt's steam-driven whaler. Leffingwell named another island – off Alaska's North Slope – Leavitt Island, after his friend the captain.

Following the destruction of his own ship, and unable to continue his work with the meager supplies left and Native assistance, Leffingwell wrote that "the writer returned to civilization in the fall of 1908 as guest of Capt. George Leavitt, of the whale ship Narwhal."

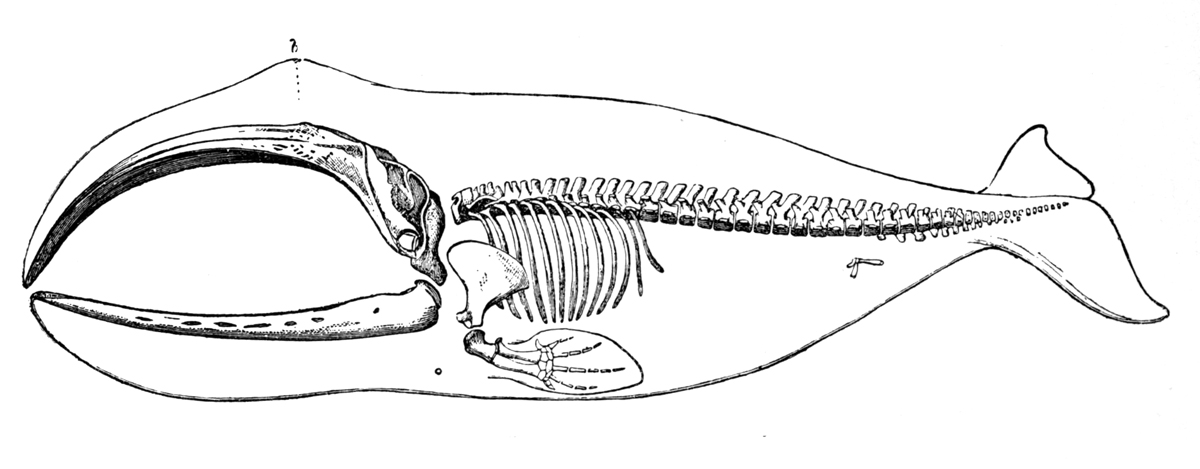
Skeleton of a bowhead whale

== Family life in Alaska and legacy ==
In the course of his years in Alaska, Leavitt developed warm relations with the Native tribes. Stefansson wrote of Leavitt's hiring of "Eskimo hunters to go south into the mountains and secure for him a large amount of caribou meat." In the course of his dealings with the native Inupiaq, Leavitt met and married a native woman named Nanouk Elguchiaq, by whom he had two sons, George and William and a daughter Nellie. For a time Capt. Leavitt resided at Point Barrow after founding one of the earliest whaling stations there.

While in Alaska, the whaling captain enjoyed a routine domestic life when not off chasing his prey. Writing in 1908, Capt. Leavitt noted his opinion of one of the local baseball teams on Herschel Island, where Inupiat and whalers played their game on the frozen surface of Pauline Bay, with the hillocks in the icy surface producing large scores. "The Northern Lights are a darn poor club", Capt. Leavitt noted in his log of May 4, 1908, of the opponents beaten by his home team at Herschel Island.

Captain Leavitt eventually retired from whaling, and moved to Honolulu, Hawaii, where he worked overseeing a railroad. But his Inupiat descendants stayed on in Barrow, Alaska, where today there are many Inupiat Leavitts in the local phone book. The Maine sea captain's descendant James Leavitt owns a darting gun carried aboard his ancestor's ship Balaena. The gun is still in use by a local Inupiat whaling crew.

George Leavitt Sr. died at Queen's Hospital in Honolulu on March 1, 1925. Today Oliver Leavitt, an Inupiaq descendant of Capt. Leavitt, continues to hunt whales in the Beaufort Sea, as did his ancestor. Each spring and fall Leavitt joins other Inupiaq in the whaling hunts. When the crew captures a bowhead whale, the catch is shared, as is the tribal custom, with the entire community. When not hunting whales, Oliver Leavitt, an Army veteran of the Vietnam War, helped oversee the investments of the Arctic Slope Regional Corporation, set up by Congress in 1971 under the Alaska Native Claims Settlement Act. Leavitt helped lead the fight for the historic legislation in the 1970s. Leavitt lives in Barrow, where he volunteers for the Barrow Volunteer Search & Rescue.

The log books kept by Capt. George B. Leavitt – six volumes of observations on climate, whales, currents and amateur baseball – are now part of the permanent collection of the Business Manuscript Division of Harvard Business School's Baker Library.

== See also ==
- History of Whaling
- Leffingwell Camp Site
- Whaling in the United States
