= Narwal =

Narwal may refer to:

- Narwhal, a whale with a long helical tusk
- Narwal, Pakistan, a village in Khyber Pakhtunkhwa
- ARA Narwal, a 1962 Argentinian fishing trawler

== People with the name ==
- Pardeep Narwal (b. 1996), Indian Kabaddi athlete
- Rajesh Narwal (born 1990), Indian Kabaddi athlete
- Sonu Narwal, Indian Kabaddi athlete
- Sumit Narwal (born 1982), Indian cricketer
- Surjeet Singh Narwal (born 1990), Indian Kabaddi athlete

== See also ==
- Narwhal (disambiguation)
- Narval (disambiguation)
- Narowal (disambiguation)
