= French cruiser Fleurus =

French Navy's Wattignies-class torpedo cruiser

Fleurus
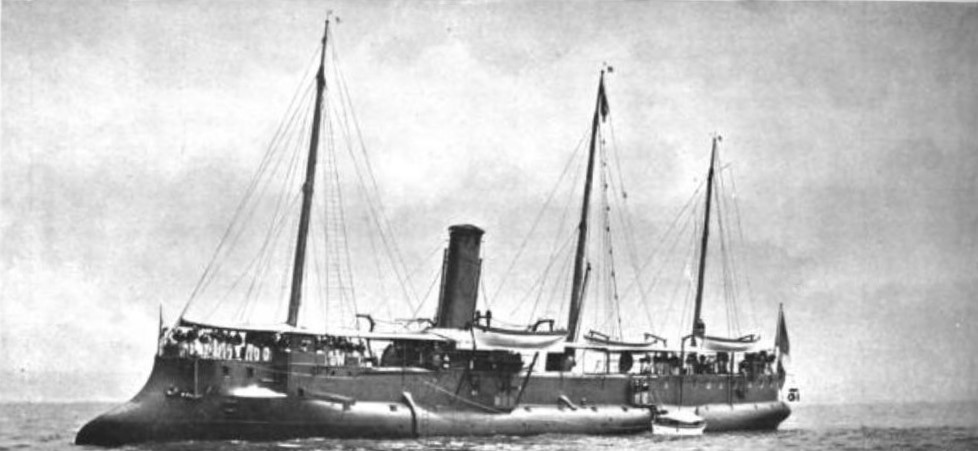
- Sister ship Wattignies

History

France
- Name: Fleurus
- Namesake: Battle of Fleurus
- Ordered: 26 July 1888
- Builder: Arsenal de Rochefort, Rochefort
- Cost: £41,858
- Laid down: 11 March 1891
- Launched: 18 March 1893
- Completed: 16 August 1893
- Decommissioned: 8 March 1910
- Fate: Sold to be broken up in 1928

General characteristics (as built)
- Class & type: Wattignies-class torpedo cruiser
- Displacement: 1,297 tonnes (1,277 long tons)
- Length: 70.985 m (232 ft 10.7 in) (o/a)
- Beam: 8.908 m (29 ft 2.7 in)
- Draft: 4.211 m (13.82 ft)
- Installed power: 4 × Admiralty boilers; 4,000 ihp (3,000 kW)
- Propulsion: 2 shafts, 2 triple-expansion steam engines
- Speed: 18 kn (33 km/h; 21 mph)
- Range: 1,800 nmi (3,300 km; 2,100 mi) at 12 kn (22 km/h; 14 mph)
- Complement: 185
- Armament: 5 × single 100 mm (3.9 in) QF guns; 6 × single 47 mm (1.9 in) QF guns; 4 × single 37 mm (1.5 in) Hotchkiss revolver cannon; 4 × 356 mm (14 in) torpedo tubes
- Armor: 40 mm (1.6 in) (deck)

The French cruiser Fleurus was a torpedo cruiser of the Wattignies class that was built for the French Navy (Marine Nationale) in the early 1890s. The ship had a main battery of five 100 mm (3.9 in) quick-firing guns, complemented by lighter guns and four 356 mm (14 in) torpedo tubes. Launched in 1891 in Rochefort, Fleurus was commissioned into the Mediterranean Squadron as part of the reserve. Trials demonstrated problems with the Admiralty boilers which, despite being replaced twice, meant that the ship was not ready for active service until they were replaced by Niclausse boilers. The cruiser was commissioned into the Northern Squadron (Escadre du Nord) in Brest. After 30 months, the cruiser was decommissioned. In 1910, the ship joined the school for engineers at Lorient, and, two years later, returned to Rochefort as a hulk. In 1928, Fleurus was sold to be broken up.

== Design and description ==
The Wattignies-class cruisers were designed as enlarged and improved versions of the preceding Condor class by Louis de Bussy in 1888. The design was created in response to the 1884 publication La marine de guerre, son passé et son avenir, cuirassé et torpilleurs (The navy, its past and its future, battleship and torpedo boat), in which the Minister of Marine, Auguste Gougeard, articulated his vision of the warship of the future. The ships measured 70.985 m (232 ft 10.7 in) overall and 68.012 m (223 ft 1.6 in) between perpendiculars, with a beam of 8.908 m (29 ft 2.7 in) and an average draft of 4.211 m (13 ft 9.8 in), increasing to 4.698 m (15 ft 5.0 in) aft. Fleurus displaced 1,297 tonnes (1,277 long tons). By 1904, this was listed as 1,310 t (1,290 long tons).

Fleurus was initially powered by two vertical triple-expansion steam engines, each driving a single propeller shaft, using steam provided by four coal-burning Admiralty boilers at a pressure of 11.26 kg/cm^{2} (160.2 psi). he machinery was designed to produce a total of 4,000 PS (2,900 kW) intended to give them a maximum speed of 18 knots (33 km/h; 21 mph). The boilers were found to be defective in trials and were replaced. The ship was finally equipped with eight Niclausse boilers. Reported output was 4,189 indicated horsepower (3,124 kW) for a speed of 18.61 kn (34.47 km/h; 21.42 mph). The cruiser carried 160 t (160 long tons; 180 short tons) of coal, which gave a range of 1,800 nautical miles (3,300 km; 2,100 mi) at a speed of 12.5 kn (23.2 km/h; 14.4 mph). The ship's complement amounted to 185 officers and enlisted men.

The main battery of the Wattignies class consisted of five 100 mm (3.9 in) 26.2-calibre M1881 QF guns. Two were located under the forecastle, two amidships on sponsons and one on the poop deck. For close-range defence against torpedo boats, they carried six 47 mm (1.9 in) M1885 3-pounder Hotchkiss guns and four 37 mm (1.5 in) 1-pounder Hotchkiss revolver cannons, all mounted singly. The ships were armed with four 356 mm (14 in) torpedo tubes, two carried forward and two on the sides. The deck was armoured with curved wrought iron that was 40 mm (1.6 in) thick in a similar way to the preceding Condor class. The armament was modified during service. By 1896, the torpedo tubes had been removed. At the same time, two of the 37 mm (1.5 in) Hotchkiss revolver cannons had been replaced by QF guns of the same bore.

== Construction and career ==
Fleurus was authorised in the 1890 budget and ordered from Arsenal de Rochefort on 20 April. The authorisation was for a ship (bâtiment) rather than a torpedo cruiser (croiseur torpilleur). Named after the Battle of Fleurus, the ship was laid down at the shipyard in Rochefort on 11 March 1891, the machinery having been ordered on 18 February. The cruiser was launched on 18 March 1893, and handed over for trials on 16 August. The total cost of the ship was £40,684. The cruiser was commissioned into the Mediterranean Squadron (Escadre de la Méditerranée).

Trials proved that there were issues in the boilers. After two years, the ship had been demoted to the second category of reserve. The boilers were replaced and trials resumed in January 1896, but the troubles remained. The upper plates in the new boilers leaked, and the ship was taken back to the yard for further work before returning to trials in March. The boilers were replaced twice, but this did not solve the problem. In 1897, the cruiser returned to the dockyard, and the Admiralty designs were replaced by eight Niclausse boilers. Trials resumed the following year. The ship was moved to the Northern Squadron (Escadre du Nord). The complement was reduced to 173.

Once trials were completed in March 1901, Fleurus was commissioned and deployed to Brest, joining the reserve of the Northern Squadron. After 30 months, the cruiser was decommissioned and was struck from the naval register on 8 March 1910. The ship was transferred to the school for engineers at Lorient. After a year, the vessel was put up for sale. Unable to find a buyer, the navy moved the ship back to Rochefort. Fleurus acted as a hulk until 1927. In 1928, the vessel was sold to be broken up.
