= Meepawala =

Village in Southern Province, Sri Lanka

Meepawala is a village located in Southern Province, Sri Lanka at 6°6′33″N 80°13′18″E, roughly 10 km away from Galle. It comprises to Bope-Poodala Divisional Secretary's domain. Cities, towns and places near Meepawala include Poddala, Holuwagoda, Narawala, and Baddegama. Meepawala Amarasooriya College is the national school in the village.
