= French cruiser Casabianca =

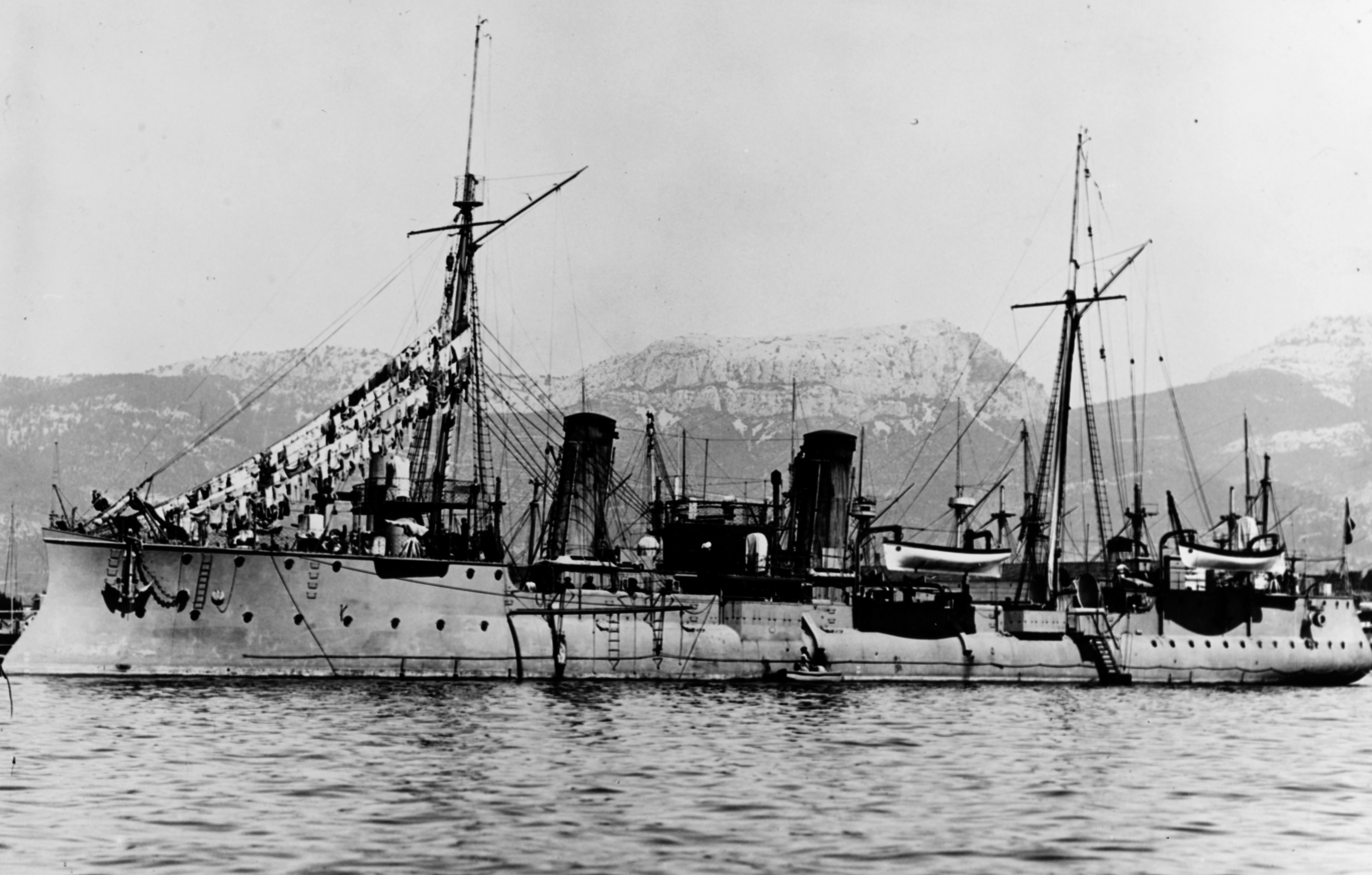
- Casabianca, early in her career, c. 1896

History

France
- Name: Casabianca
- Builder: Forges et Chantiers de la Gironde, Lormont
- Laid down: January 1894
- Launched: 21 September 1895
- Commissioned: 1896
- Fate: Mined and sunk, 3 June 1915

General characteristics
- Class & type: D'Iberville-class cruiser
- Displacement: 970 long tons (990 t)
- Length: 80 m (262 ft 6 in) pp
- Beam: 8.08 to 8.2 m (26 ft 6 in to 26 ft 11 in)
- Draft: 3.45 m (11 ft 4 in)
- Installed power: 8 × water-tube boilers; 5,000 indicated horsepower (3,700 kW)
- Propulsion: 2 × triple-expansion steam engines; 2 × screw propellers
- Range: 6,000 nmi (11,000 km; 6,900 mi) at 10 knots (19 km/h; 12 mph)
- Complement: 140–143
- Armament: 1 × 100 mm (3.9 in) gun; 3 × 9-pounder; 6–7 × 47 mm (1.9 in) Hotchkiss guns; 3 × 450 mm (17.7 in) torpedo tubes
- Armor: Deck: 20 to 40 mm (0.79 to 1.57 in); Conning tower: 40 mm

Casabianca was the third and final member of the D'Iberville class of torpedo cruisers built for the French Navy in the 1890s. The class is also sometimes classified as torpedo gunboats or torpedo avisos. The D'Iberville-class ships were a development of earlier torpedo cruisers, with the chief improvement being a significantly higher speed. Casabianca was armed with three 450 mm (17.7 in) torpedo tubes and a single 100 mm (3.9 in) gun as her primary offensive armament.

The ship served with the Mediterranean Squadron for the majority of her peacetime career, following her completion in 1896. During this time, her chief activities consisted of annual fleet maneuvers conducted every summer. She had been stationed as a guard ship in Tunis, French Tunisia in 1901, before returning to the Mediterranean Squadron by 1903. She was later converted into a minelayer in 1913, and served in this capacity during World War I. Casabianca accidentally struck one of her own mines during an operation off Smyrna on 3 June 1915, sinking with the loss of half of her crew. Sixty-six survivors were rescued by a nearby British destroyer.

== Design ==
Plan and profile drawing of the D'Iberville class

In the early 1880s, the French Navy began building a series of torpedo cruisers to make use of the new, self-propelled Whitehead torpedo. The first classes of these vessels, the Condor and Wattignies classes, were relatively large vessels. Two further classes, the Bombe and Lévrier classes, were significantly smaller ships. The three vessels of the D'Iberville class marked a return to larger vessels, with greatly increased speed compared to their predecessors. All of these ships have been alternatively called torpedo cruisers, torpedo gunboats, or torpedo avisos.

Casabianca was 80 m (262 ft 6 in) long between perpendiculars, with a beam of 8.08 to 8.2 m (26 ft 6 in to 26 ft 11 in) and a draft of 3.45 m (11 ft 4 in). She displaced 970 long tons (990 t). Her crew varied from 140 to 143 officers and enlisted men over the course of her career. The ship's propulsion system consisted of a pair of triple-expansion steam engines driving two screw propellers. Steam was provided by eight coal-burning water-tube boilers that were ducted into two funnels. Her machinery was rated to produce 5,000 indicated horsepower (3,700 kW) for a top speed of 21.5 to 22 knots (39.8 to 40.7 km/h; 24.7 to 25.3 mph). She had a cruising radius of 6,000 nautical miles (11,000 km; 6,900 mi) at 10 knots (19 km/h; 12 mph).

The ship was armed with a main battery of one 100 mm (3.9 in) gun in a pivot mount forward. For close-range defense against torpedo boats, she carried three 65 mm (2.6 in) 9-pounder quick-firing guns and six or seven 47 mm (1.9 in) 3-pounder Hotchkiss guns, all in individual mounts. She was also armed with three 450 mm (17.7 in) torpedo tubes in her hull above the waterline. Armor protection consisted of a curved armor deck that was 20 mm (0.8 in) thick, along with same thickness of plating on the conning tower.

== Service history ==
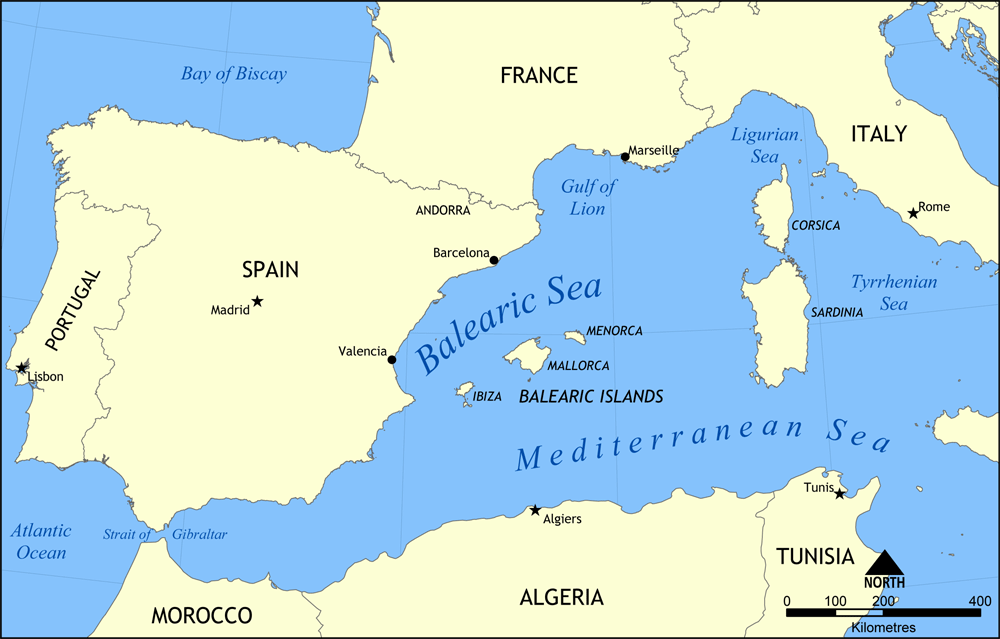
Map of the western Mediterranean, where Casabianca spent the majority of her peacetime career

The keel for Casabiana was laid down at the Forges et Chantiers de la Gironde shipyard in Lormont in January 1894, the last member of the class to begin construction. She was launched on 21 September 1895 and fitting-out work was completed in 1896. During her initial sea trials that year, she reached a speed of 21.22 knots (39.30 km/h; 24.42 mph). She was commissioned in time to join the Mediterranean Squadron on 15 June. Immediately thereafter, she took part in that year's maneuvers with the Mediterranean Squadron, which lasted from 6 to 30 July. She served as part of the cruiser screen for the 2nd Division, along with the armored cruiser Latouche-Tréville, the protected cruiser Suchet, and the torpedo cruiser Faucon.

The ship remained with the cruiser screen for the Mediterranean Squadron in 1897, along with her sister ship D'Iberville and several other vessels. She participated in the fleet maneuvers that year, which lasted from 7 to 30 July, and included night maneuvers, fleet defense against torpedo boats, and simulated battle between squadrons of battleships. Casabianca had one of her torpedo tubes removed in 1899. By 1901, the ship was reduced to the Reserve Division, and was stationed as a guard ship in Tunis. She participated in the 1902 fleet maneuvers, which occurred in three phases, though Casabianca was only involved in the last stage. This set of maneuvers lasted from 28 July to 4 August, and Casabianca was assigned to the main French fleet, tasked with defeating a simulated enemy fleet that represented the British Mediterranean Fleet.

She was transferred back to the Mediterranean Squadron in 1903. By that time, the ship lay at Toulon, awaiting repairs to her boilers, along with two dozen other major warships with similarly troublesome boilers. The ship was converted into a minelayer in 1913. She had a capacity of 97 naval mines. Casabianca was assigned to the Groupe de mouilleurs de mines (Minelayer Group) by the start of World War I in August 1914, along with her similar converted sister ship Cassini and the converted minelayer La Hire. From the start of the conflict through mid-1915, Casabianca patrolled the Strait of Otranto and off Corfu at the southern end of the Adriatic Sea. The ship struck a naval mine she had laid herself off Smyrna and sank on 3 June during operations against the Ottoman Empire. Out of a complement of 128 men, 66 were rescued by a British destroyer, including the ship's captain.
