= Gougeard =

Gougeard is a French surname. Notable people with the surname include:

- Alexis Gougeard (born 1993), French cyclist
- Auguste Gougeard (1827–1886), French Navy officer and politician
