= Narval =

Narval may refer to:

== Submarines ==
- French submarine Narval, a list of four French submarines and one class of submarines (Q4 of 1899; 1925; T4, used by FFNF starting in 1944; S631, lead ship of the Narval-class, 1950s)
  - French Narval-class submarines of the 1950s
- Russian Narval-class submarines of the early 1910s
- NRP Narval (S160), Portuguese submarine, formerly British S-class HMS Spur

== Other uses ==
- Narwhal, a species of whale with a long helical tusk
- SNCASO SO.8000 Narval, a 1940s French aircraft
- Narval Bay, a bay on South Georgia Island in the southern Atlantic
- Narwal (disambiguation)
