= French submarine Narval =

The French Navy has operated four submarines named Narval (French for "Narwhal")

- French submarine Narval (Q4), a pioneering submarine of the late 19th century
- French submarine Narval (1925), a Requin-class submarine of the 1920s
- French submarine Narval (T4), ex-Italian submarine Bronzo (an Acciaio-class submarine), captured by the Royal Navy and transferred to the FNFL in 1944
- French submarine Narval (S631), lead ship of the Narval-class submarines of the 1950s
