= D'Iberville-class cruiser =

- Cassini, c. 1901

Class overview
- Name: D'Iberville class
- Operators: French Navy
- Completed: 3
- Retired: 3

General characteristics
- Class & type: Torpedo cruiser
- Displacement: 952 long tons (967 t)
- Length: 80 m (262 ft 6 in) pp
- Beam: 8.08 to 8.2 m (26 ft 6 in to 26 ft 11 in)
- Draft: 3.45 m (11 ft 4 in)
- Installed power: 8 × water-tube boilers; 5,000 indicated horsepower (3,700 kW)
- Propulsion: 2 × quadruple-expansion steam engines; 2 × screw propellers
- Range: 6,000 nmi (11,000 km; 6,900 mi) at 10 knots (19 km/h; 12 mph)
- Complement: 140–143
- Armament: 1 × 100 mm (3.9 in) gun; 3 × 9-pounder; 6–7 × 47 mm (1.9 in) Hotchkiss guns; 6 × 450 mm (17.7 in) torpedo tubes
- Armor: Deck: 20 to 40 mm (0.79 to 1.57 in); Conning tower: 40 mm

The D'Iberville class was a group of torpedo cruisers built for the French Navy in the 1890s. The class comprised three ships: D'Iberville, Cassini, and Casabianca.

== Design ==
In the early 1880s, the French Navy began building a series of torpedo cruisers to make use of the new, self-propelled Whitehead torpedo. The first classes of these vessels, the Condor and Wattignies classes, were relatively large vessels. Two further classes, the Bombe and Lévrier classes, were significantly smaller ships. The three vessels of the D'Iberville class marked a return to larger vessels, with greatly increased speed compared to their predecessors. The design for the first vessel was prepared by the Ateliers et Chantiers de la Loire shipyard as part of a design competition requested by Édouard Barbey, the Minister of the Marine. All of these ships have been alternatively called torpedo cruisers, torpedo gunboats, or torpedo avisos.

=== Characteristics ===
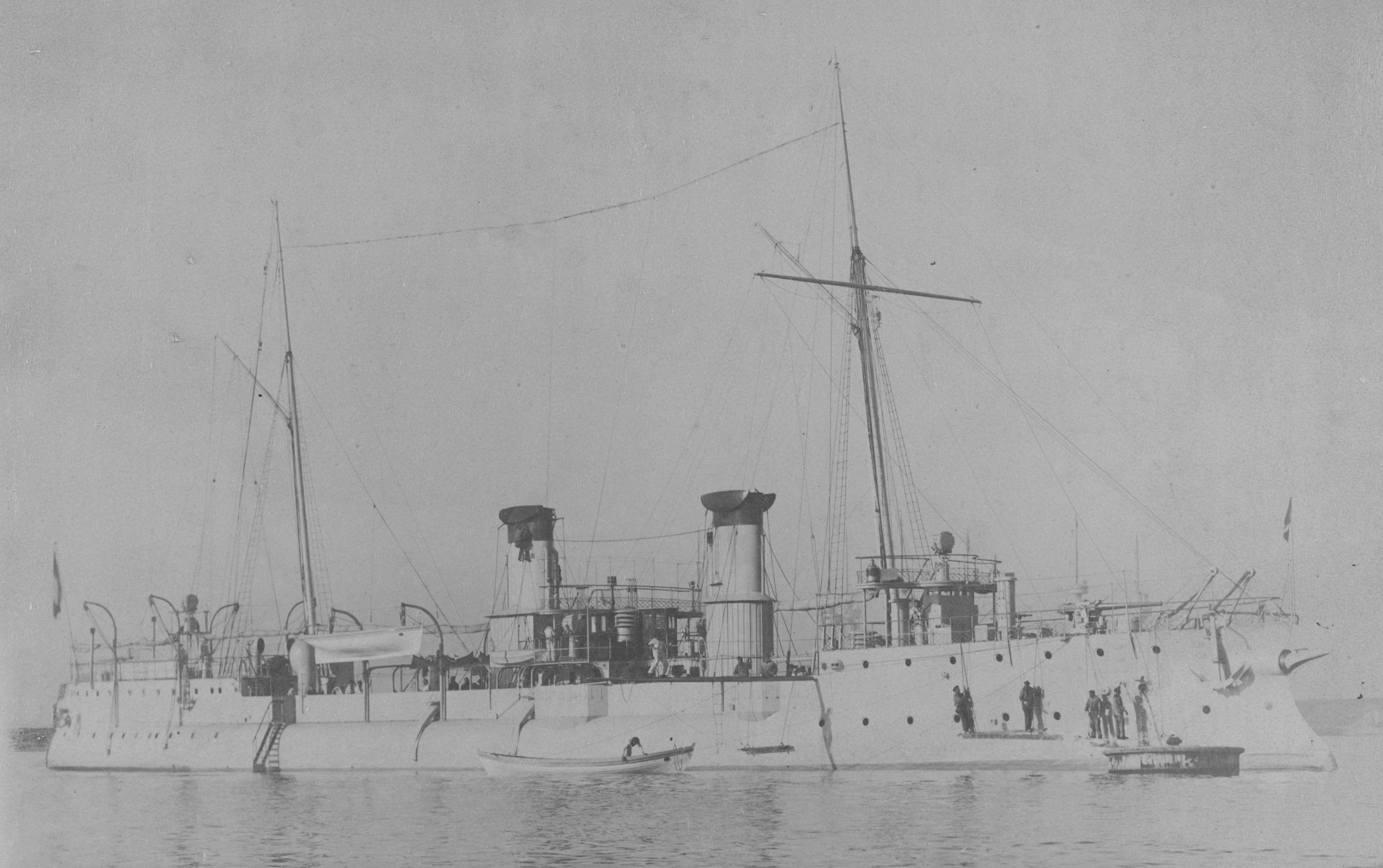
D'Iberville, date and location unknown

The ships of the D'Iberville class were 80 m (262 ft 6 in) long between perpendiculars, with a beam of 8.08 to 8.2 m (26 ft 6 in to 26 ft 11 in) and a draft of 3.45 m (11 ft 4 in). D'Iberville displaced 952 long tons (967 t), while Cassini and Casabianca were slightly heavier, displacing 970 long tons (990 t). The ships had a raised forecastle and quarterdeck, and as was typical for French warships of the period, they featured a pronounced ram bow. They were fitted with a pair of pole masts. Their crew varied from 140 to 143 officers and enlisted men over the course of their careers. The ships rolled very badly in heavy seas.

The first two ships' propulsion system consisted of a pair of quadruple-expansion steam engines driving two screw propellers, while Casabianca had two triple-expansion steam engines. Steam was provided by eight coal-burning water-tube boilers that were ducted into two funnels. Their machinery was rated to produce 5,000 indicated horsepower (3,700 kW) for a top speed of 21.5 to 22 knots (39.8 to 40.7 km/h; 24.7 to 25.3 mph). Coal storage amounted to 115 long tons (117 t), which provided a cruising radius of 6,000 nautical miles (11,000 km; 6,900 mi) at 10 knots (19 km/h; 12 mph). The ships were, at the time of their completion, the fastest torpedo cruisers in the world.

The ships were armed with a main battery of one 100 mm (3.9 in) gun in a pivot mount forward. For close-range defense against torpedo boats, they carried three 9-pounder quick-firing guns and six or seven 47 mm (1.9 in) 3-pounder Hotchkiss guns, all in individual mounts. The 9-pounders were placed further aft, one on each broadside and the third on the stern. D'Iberville was also armed with six 450 mm (17.7 in) torpedo tubes, while Cassini and Casabianca only received three; all of the vessels carried them in their hulls above the waterline.

Armor protection for D'Iberville consisted of a curved armor deck that was 20 mm (0.79 in) thick, increasing to 40 mm (1.6 in) on downward sloping sides that covered the propulsion machinery spaces. Cassini and Casabianca had a deck that was uniformly 20 mm thick, including the sloped sides. All three ships had 40 mm plating on the conning tower.

=== Modifications ===
Plan and profile drawing of the D'Iberville class

D'Iberville had her torpedo tubes removed in 1896, and had additional Hotchkiss guns installed in their place. Cassini and Casabianca had one of their tubes removed by 1899.

Cassini and Casabianca were converted into minelayers in 1913, with a capacity of 97 naval mines.

== Construction ==
Construction data
Name	Shipyard	Laid down	Launched	Completed
D'Iberville	Chantiers de la Loire, Saint-Nazaire	August 1891	11 September 1892	1894
Cassini	Société Nouvelle des Forges et Chantiers de la Méditerranée, La Seyne-sur-Mer	November 1892	5 June 1894	1895
Casabianca	Forges et Chantiers de la Gironde, Lormont	January 1894	21 September 1895	1896

== Service history ==
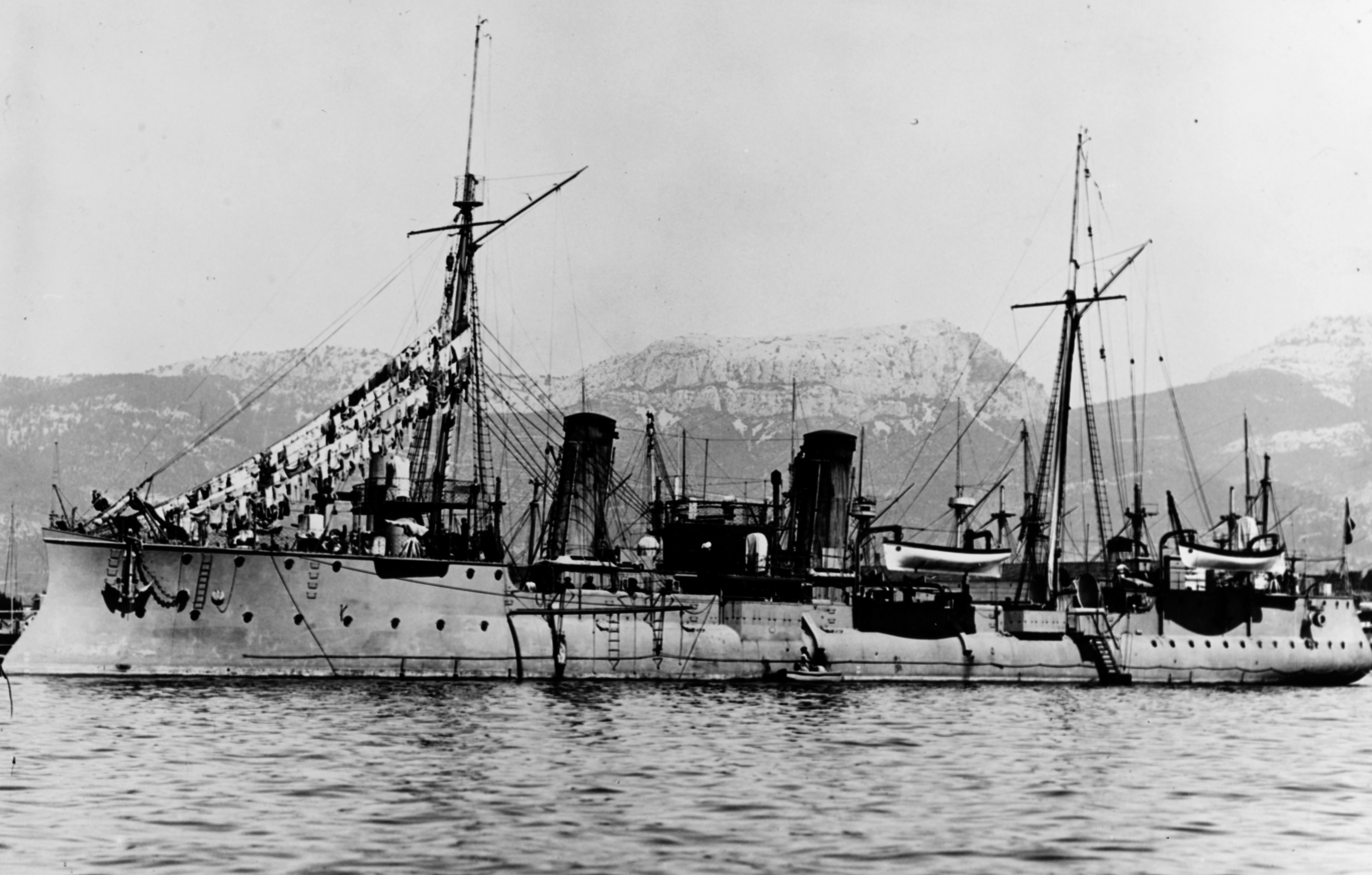
Casabianca, date and location unknown
