= French cruiser Wattignies =

French Wattignies-class torpedo cruiser

Wattignies
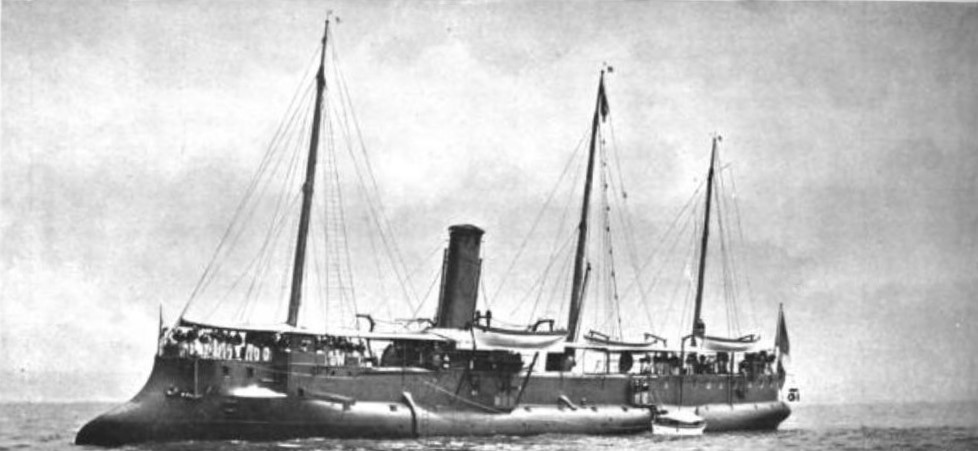
- Wattignies

History

France
- Name: Wattignies
- Namesake: Battle of Wattignies
- Ordered: 26 July 1888
- Builder: Arsenal de Cherbourg, Cherbourg
- Cost: £41,858
- Laid down: 8 October 1889
- Launched: 9 April 1891
- Completed: 15 February 1892
- Fate: Struck from the naval register, 8 April 1908

General characteristics (as built)
- Class & type: Wattignies-class torpedo cruiser
- Displacement: 1,297 tonnes (1,277 long tons)
- Length: 70.985 m (232 ft 10.7 in) (o/a)
- Beam: 8.908 m (29 ft 2.7 in)
- Draft: 4.211 m (13.82 ft)
- Installed power: 4 × Admiralty boilers; 4,000 ihp (3,000 kW)
- Propulsion: 2 shafts, 2 triple-expansion steam engines
- Speed: 18 kn (33 km/h; 21 mph)
- Range: 1,800 nmi (3,300 km; 2,100 mi) at 12 kn (22 km/h; 14 mph)
- Complement: 185
- Armament: 5 × single 100 mm (3.9 in) QF guns; 6 × single 47 mm (1.9 in) QF guns; 4 × single 37 mm (1.5 in) Hotchkiss revolver cannon; 4 × 356 mm (14.0 in) torpedo tubes
- Armor: 40 mm (1.6 in) (deck)

The French cruiser Wattignies was the lead ship of a class of two torpedo cruisers, the Wattignies class, that were built for the French Navy (Marine Nationale) in the early 1890s. The ship was the first in French Navy service to mount quick-firing (QF) guns. As well as five 100 mm (3.9 in) QF guns, the cruiser was fitted with four 356 mm (14.0 in) torpedo tubes. Launched in 1891 in Cherbourg, Wattignies was commissioned into the Mediterranean Squadron (Escadre de la Méditerranée) as part of the reserve. The cruiser saw service in Crete from 1896, supporting French humanitarian and political objectives on the island. This proved to be the only active deployment that the ship would perform. In 1899, the ship was transferred to Rochefort, returning to the reserve. Wattignies remained in service for another eight years until being retired and, in 1908, struck from the naval register.

== Design and description ==
The Wattignies-class cruisers were designed as enlarged and improved versions of the preceding Condor class by Louis de Bussy in 1888. The design was created in response to the 1884 publication La Marine de Guerre, son Passé et son Avenir, Cuirassé et Torpilleurs (The Navy, its Past and its Future, Battleship and Torpedo boats), in which Minister of Marine, Auguste Gougeard, articulated his vision of the warship of the future. The ships measured 70.985 m (232 ft 10.7 in) overall and 68.012 m (223 ft 1.6 in) between perpendiculars, with a beam of 8.908 m (29 ft 2.7 in) and an average draft of 4.211 m (13 ft 9.8 in), increasing to 4.698 m (15 ft 5.0 in) aft. Wattignies displaced 1,297 tonnes (1,277 long tons). By 1904, this was listed as 1,310 t (1,290 long tons; 1,440 short tons).

Wattignies was powered by two vertical triple-expansion steam engines, each driving a single propeller shaft, using steam provided by four coal-burning Admiralty boilers at a pressure of 11.26 kg/cm^{2} (160.2 psi). The machinery was designed to produce a total of 4,000 PS (2,900 kW) intended to give them a maximum speed of 18 knots (33 km/h; 21 mph). Reported output was 4,189 indicated horsepower (3,124 kW) for a speed of 18.61 kn (34.47 km/h; 21.42 mph). The cruiser carried 160 t (160 long tons; 180 short tons) of coal, which gave a range of 1,800 nautical miles (3,300 km; 2,100 mi) at a speed of 12.5 kn (23.2 km/h; 14.4 mph). The ship's complement amounted to 185 officers and enlisted men.

The main battery of the Wattignies class consisted of five 100 mm (3.9 in) 26.2-calibre M1881 QF guns. Two were located under the forecastle, two amidships on sponsons and one on the poop deck. For close-range defence against torpedo boats, they carried six 47 mm (1.9 in) M1885 3-pounder Hotchkiss guns and four 37 mm (1.5 in) 1-pounder Hotchkiss revolver cannons, all mounted singly. The ships were armed with four 356 mm (14.0 in) torpedo tubes, two carried forward and two on the sides. The deck was armoured with curved wrought iron that was 40 mm (1.6 in) thick in a similar way to the preceding Condor class. The armament was modified during service. By 1896, the torpedo tubes had been removed. At the same time, two of the 37 mm (1.5 in) Hotchkiss revolver cannons were replaced by QF guns of the same bore.

== Construction and career ==
Wattignies was ordered from Arsenal de Cherbourg on 26 July 1888 and authorised in the 1889 budget. Construction started at the shipyard in Cherbourg on 30 August 1888, the ship being laid down on 8 October the following year. The machinery, ordered on 14 November 1888, was installed between 1 February and 17 September 1891. The cruiser was launched on 9 April 1891, and completed on 5 February 1892. Wattignies was named for the Battle of Wattignies. The vessel was the first ship in the French Navy to have quick-firing guns. The total cost of the ship was £41,858.

On completion, Wattignies undertook trials until 27 July 1892, at which point the vessel arrived in Toulon to be commissioned in the Mediterranean Squadron (Escadre de la Méditerranée). Almost immediately, the cruiser was allocated to the reserve division, remaining there until 1898. The ship's complement was reduced to 162. On 1 July 1894, Wattignies joined the Third Division of the Active Squadron for an exercise that employed much of the Mediterranean Squadron. The exercise involved simulated attacks by torpedo boats and proved the vulnerability of battleships to torpedo attacks.

In 1895, increasing unrest in Crete led the Ottoman Empire to seek assistance from France in restoring peace between the different factions. On 24 June, the French ambassador, along with representatives from five other European powers submitted a response, which proposed a military and political solution rather than humanitarian one. However, humanitarian support was required, and French vessels were used to evacuate civilians. As the following year began, country took responsibility for an area of the island, to keep the peace. To support these endeavours, and to protect their national interest, the French Navy allocated warships to the island. During September 1896, it was the turn of Wattignies to be designated a station ship in Crete, relieving the ironclad Marceau. Following a period of revolt, on 28 November 1898, the last Ottoman troops left Crete and the island was handed to Greece.

In the interim, Wattignies had left the island, replaced by an International Squadron. The cruiser was assigned to Port Said. The ship remained there until relieved by the torpedo cruiser Condor in 1898. Between 1899 and 1907, Wattignies was in Rochefort, but still held in reserve. The cruiser was retired and, on 8 April 1908, struck from the naval register. Less than 20 years had elapsed since the order had been placed for the cruiser's construction.
