= Narwal, Pakistan =

Narwal
- Location within Azad Kashmir
- Coordinates: 33.74979°N 73.827915°E
- Country: Pakistan
- State: Azad Kashmir
- District: Poonch District
- Time zone: UTC+5 (PST)

Narwal is a village situated in Poonch district (Rawalakot) Azad Kashmir, Pakistan. It is located between the towns of Trarkhel and Hajira. Narwal is situated 146 kilometres (89 ml) from Islamabad, Pakistan and about 130 km (79 ml) from the city of Rawalpindi. It is linked with Rawalpindi and Islamabad via the Goyain Nala road and Rawlakot Khaigala hajira roads. It is also linked with Rawalpindi via Sudhnuti. Narwal is a hill station.
