= Narwhal (whaling vessel) =

Part of the Arctic fleet between 1883 and 1907

Narwhal was a whaling ship, a barque which was part of the Arctic fleet between 1883 and 1907.
