= French submarine Sirène (1901) =

- Sirène, c. 1909

History

France
- Name: Sirène
- Namesake: The Siren
- Ordered: 20 June 1899
- Builder: Arsenal de Cherbourg
- Laid down: 28 August 1900
- Launched: 4 May 1901
- Commissioned: 14 December 1901
- Stricken: 12 November 1919
- Fate: Sold for scrap, 12 November 1920

General characteristics
- Class & type: Sirène-class submarine
- Displacement: 157 t (155 long tons) (surfaced); 213 t (210 long tons) (submerged)
- Length: 32.5 m (106 ft 8 in) (o/a)
- Beam: 3.9 m (12 ft 10 in)
- Draft: 2.5 m (8 ft 2 in)
- Installed power: 1 × du Temple boiler; 250 ihp (190 kW) (steam engine); 100 bhp (75 kW) (electric motor)
- Propulsion: 1 × shaft; 1 × triple-expansion steam engine; 1 × electric motor
- Speed: 9.75 knots (18.1 km/h; 11.2 mph) (surfaced); 5.8 knots (10.7 km/h; 6.7 mph) (submerged)
- Range: 535 nmi (991 km; 616 mi) at 6.9 knots (12.8 km/h; 7.9 mph) surfaced; 52 nmi (96 km; 60 mi) at 3.4 knots (6.3 km/h; 3.9 mph) submerged
- Complement: 12
- Armament: 2 × external 450 mm (17.7 in) Drzewiecki drop collars; 2 × external Tissier 450 mm torpedo launchers

Sirène was the lead ship of her class of four submarines built for the French Navy during the first decade of the 20th century. She played a minor role in the First World War.

== Design and description ==
The Sirène-class submarines were improved versions of the Narval. The boats displaced 157 metric tons (155 long tons) on the surface and 213 metric tons (210 long tons) submerged. They had an overall length of 32.5 meters (106 ft 8 in), a beam of 3.9 meters (12 ft 10 in), and a draft of 2.5 meters (8 ft 2 in). Their crew numbered 2 officers and 12 enlisted men.

On the surface, the Sirènes were powered by a 250-indicated-horsepower (190 kW) vertical triple-expansion steam engine that used steam from a du Temple boiler to drive the single propeller shaft. A single 100-shaft-horsepower (75 kW) electric motor powered the boats underwater. The submarines were designed to reach a maximum speed of 9.75 knots (18.06 km/h; 11.22 mph) on the surface and 5.8 knots (10.7 km/h; 6.7 mph) underwater. During her sea trials Sirène attained 9.8 knots (18.1 km/h; 11.3 mph) from 288 ihp (215 kW) on the surface and 5.9 kn (10.9 km/h; 6.8 mph) from 121 shp (90 kW) while submerged. The boats were provided with 4.5 metric tons (4 long tons) of fuel oil that gave them a surfaced range of 535 nautical miles (991 km; 616 mi) at 6.9 knots (12.8 km/h; 7.9 mph); their batteries gave the submarines a range of 52 nmi (96 km; 60 mi) at 3.4 knots (6.3 km/h; 3.9 mph) under water.

The Sirène class was armed with two external 450-millimeter (17.7 in) Tissier torpedo launchers and two external 450 mm Drzewiecki drop collar. The Tissier torpedo launchers were replaced by fixed torpedo launchers in 1906.

== Construction and career ==
Sirène was ordered on 20 June 1899 and laid down on 28 August 1900 at the Arsenal de Cherbourg. The boat was launched on 4 May 1901 and commissioned on 14 December.

== Bibliography ==
- Campbell, N. J. M. (1979). "France". In Chesneau, Roger & Kolesnik, Eugene M. (eds.). Conway's All the World's Fighting Ships 1860–1905. Conway Maritime Press. pp. 283–333. ISBN 0-8317-0302-4.
- Couhat, Jean Labayle (1974). French Warships of World War I. London: Ian Allan. ISBN 0-7110-0445-5.
- Garier, Gérard (1995). Du Plongeur (1863) aux Guêpe (1904) [From Plongeur (1863) to Guêpe (1904)]. L'odyssée technique et humaine du sous-marin en France (in French). Vol. 1. Marines édition. ISBN 2-909675-19-X.
- Garier, Gérard (2002). A l'épreuve de la Grande Guerre. L'odyssée technique et humaine du sous-marin en France (in French). Vol. 3–2. Marines édition. ISBN 2-909675-81-5.
- Roberts, Stephen S. (2021). French Warships in the Age of Steam 1859–1914: Design, Construction, Careers and Fates. Seaforth Publishing. ISBN 978-1-5267-4533-0.
- Roche, Jean-Michel (2005). Dictionnaire des bâtiments de la flotte de guerre française de Colbert à nos jours 2, 1870 - 2006. Roche. ISBN 978-2-9525917-0-6. OCLC 165892922.
- Smigielski, Adam (1985). "France". In Gray, Randal (ed.). Conway's All the World's Fighting Ships 1906–1921. Naval Institute Press. pp. 190–220. ISBN 0-87021-907-3.
