= Wattignies-class cruiser =

Torpedo cruiser class of the French Navy

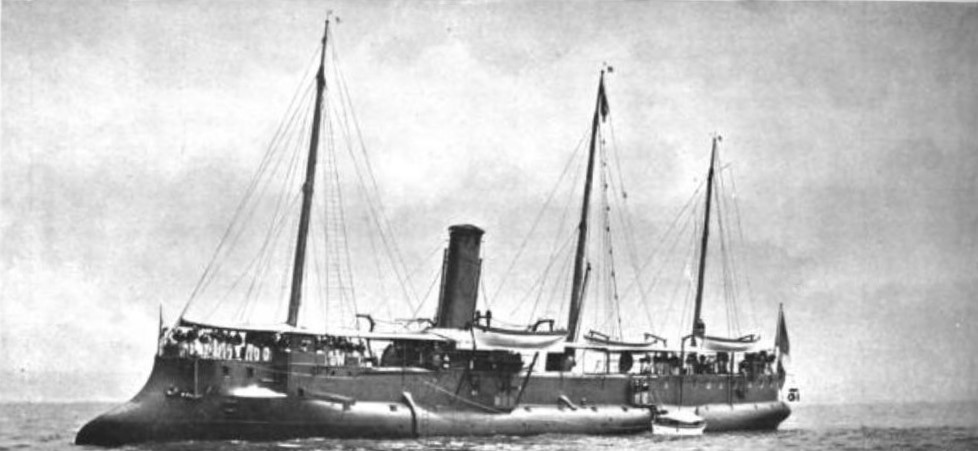
- Wattignies

Class overview
- Name: Wattignies class
- Operators: French Navy
- Preceded by: Condor class
- Succeeded by: D'Iberville class
- Built: 1891–1892
- In service: 1892–1928
- Completed: 2
- Retired: 2

General characteristics
- Type: Torpedo cruiser
- Displacement: 1,297 t (1,277 long tons; 1,430 short tons)
- Length: 70.985 m (232 ft 10.7 in) loa
- Beam: 8.908 m (29 ft 2.7 in)
- Draft: 4.211 m (13 ft 9.8 in) (mean)
- Installed power: 4 × Admiralty boilers; 4,000 ihp (3,000 kW)
- Propulsion: 2 × triple expansion steam engines; 2 × screw propellers
- Speed: 18 knots (33 km/h; 21 mph)
- Range: 1,800 nmi (3,300 km; 2,100 mi) at 12 knots (22 km/h; 14 mph)
- Complement: 185
- Armament: 5 × 100 mm (3.9 in) QF guns; 6 × 47 mm (1.9 in) QF guns; 4 × 37 mm (1.5 in) Hotchkiss revolver cannon; 4 × 356 mm (14 in) torpedo tubes
- Armor: Deck: 40 mm (1.6 in)

The Wattignies class was a group of two torpedo cruisers built for the French Navy in the early 1890s. The class comprised Wattignies and Fleurus. They were ordered as part of a fleet program that, in accordance with the theories of the Jeune École, proposed a fleet based on cruisers and torpedo boats to defend France. The two ships were an improved version of the preceding Condor class, built around an armament of four 356 mm (14 in) torpedo tubes. Both ships saw short commissions. The lead ship of the class, Wattignies, was launched in 1891 and served with the Mediterranean Squadron until 1898. The cruiser was struck ten years later. Having suffered from boiler problems, Fleurus was commissioned for only 30 months in 1901 but compensated by remaining in service as a training school and hulk until 1927.

== Design and development ==
In the early 1880s, the Jeune École doctrine, became popular in French naval circles. Key to this was the replacement of the battleship broadside with smaller vessels armed with torpedoes, such as smaller cruisers and torpedo boats, to defend France and attack enemy merchant shipping. In 1884, the Minister of the Navy, Auguste Gougeard, published La marine de guerre, son passé et son avenir, cuirassé et torpilleurs (The navy, its past and its future, battleship and torpedo boat) in which he articulated his vision for the warship of the future. His design was built around a torpedo armament, the highest possible speed, between 20.5 and 21 knots (38.0 and 38.9 km/h; 23.6 and 24.2 mph), and a strong armoured deck.

The French Navy responded by issuing a request to the naval architect Louis de Bussy for a new design. This was a more conservative brief, being fundamentally an enlargement of the preceding Condor-class cruisers with two 65 mm (2.6 in) guns and a speed of 18 knots (33 km/h; 21 mph). As the Condor class were already making 17.78 knots (32.93 km/h; 20.46 mph), he decided that he would achieve the shortfall through nominal increase in power, increasing boiler pressure from 7 kg/cm^{2} (100 psi) to 10 kg/cm^{2} (140 psi) and replacing the compound steam engines with triple expansion engines, and a slightly finer hull. The frames were extended by 2 m (6.6 ft) to accommodate the larger engines. The design was submitted to the Conseil des travaux (Board of Construction) on 10 July 1888, whose only amendment was to move the forecastle aft following the design of the cruiser Forbin.

=== Characteristics ===
The ships of the Wattignies class were 68.012 m (223 ft 1.6 in) long between perpendiculars and 70.985 m (232 ft 10.7 in) long overall, with a beam of 8.908 m (29 ft 2.7 in) and an average draft of 4.211 m (13 ft 9.8 in), increasing to 4.698 m (15 ft 5.0 in) aft. They displaced 1,297 t (1,277 long tons; 1,430 short tons) as completed. By 1904, this had expanded to 1,310 t (1,290 long tons; 1,440 short tons). The ships' propulsion system consisted of a pair of triple-expansion steam engines driving two screw propellers. Steam was provided by four coal-burning Admiralty boilers at a pressure of 11.26 kg/cm^{2} (160.2 psi). The boilers were ducted into two funnels. Their machinery was rated to produce 4,000 indicated horsepower (3,000 kW) at 140rpm for a top speed of 18 kn (33 km/h; 21 mph). Reported output was 4,189 indicated horsepower (3,124 kW) for a speed of 18.61 kn (34.47 km/h; 21.42 mph). Coal storage amounted to 130 t (130 long tons; 140 short tons), which allowed the ships to steam for 1,800 nautical miles (3,300 km; 2,100 mi) at a speed of 12 kn (22 km/h; 14 mph). Their complement consisted of 185 officers and enlisted men.

The ships were armed with four 356 mm (14 in) torpedo tubes, two carried forward and two on the sides. These were supported by a main battery of five 100 mm (3.9 in) 26.2-caliber M1881 QF guns in individual mounts. Two were located under the forecastle, two amidships on sponsons and one on the poop deck. For close-range defense against torpedo boats, they carried six 47 mm (1.9 in) M1885 3-pounder Hotchkiss guns and four 37 mm (1.5 in) 1-pounder Hotchkiss revolver cannons. Armor protection was similar to the Condor class. It consisted of a curved wrought iron armor deck that was 40 mm (1.6 in) thick. Above the deck, a layer of highly sub-divided watertight compartments was added to control flooding in the event of battle damage. Each vessel had three masts, three searchlights, and a ram bow.

=== Modifications ===
The boilers fitted to the second member of the class, Fleurus, were found to be defective in trials and were replaced. The ship was finally equipped with eight Niclausse boilers. During their lives, the ships had their armament modified. By 1896 the torpedo tubes had been removed and two of the 37 mm (1.5 in) Hotchkiss revolver cannons replaced by QF guns of the same caliber.

== Construction ==
Construction data
| Name | Shipyard | Laid down | Launched | Commissioned | Cost |
|---|---|---|---|---|---|
| Wattignies | Arsenal de Cherbourg, Cherbourg | 8 October 1889 | 9 April 1891 | 15 February 1892 | £41,858 |
| Fleurus | Arsenal de Rochefort, Rochefort | 11 March 1891 | 18 March 1893 | 16 August 1893 | £40,684 |

== Service history ==
When the cruiser entered service, Wattignies was the first ship in the French Navy to have quick-firing guns. Initially placed in the Mediterranean Squadron, the vessel was transferred to the Reserve Squadron within a year. In 1896 the cruiser was deployed to Crete to act as station ship to replace the ironclad Marceau. Two years later the vessel was at Port Said but was sent to Rochefort in 1899. Wattignies was struck from the naval register on 8 April 1908.

Due to problems with the boilers, Fleurus did not complete trials until March 1901, at which the cruiser was immediately sent to reserve. Decommissioned in 1903 after only 30 months service, the ship was struck on 8 March 1910. The vessel was subsequently moored at Lorient as part of a school for engineers until 1912, and then as a hulk at Rochefort in 1927. Fleurus was sold to be broken up in 1928.
