= Narawala =

Sri Lankan village

Coordinates: 6°06′N 80°14′E

Narawala is a medium size village that is situated in Galle District, southern province of Sri Lanka.
