= Auguste Gougeard =

French military officer and politician

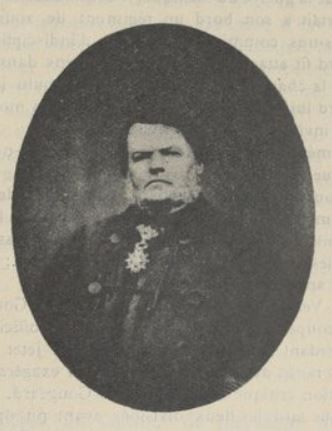
Auguste Gougeard Portrait

Auguste Gougeard (15 November 1827 – March 1886, Paris) was a French military officer and politician. A navy officer by background, he was commissioned into the French Army as a general during the Franco-Prussian War at Léon Gambetta's instigation.

He rose to captain and campaigned in Africa, the Crimea and the Far East. He was made général de division of the auxiliary army to the armée de la Loire, under Alfred Chanzy's command.

A friend of Léon Gambetta, he served as Minister of the Navy from November 1881 to January 1882 in Gambetta's temporary ministry.

He was a commander of the Légion d'honneur.

He wrote several works, including a series on the French Navy and its institutions.

== Bibliography ==
- http://viaf.org/viaf/233329196
