= French submarine Narval (Q4) =

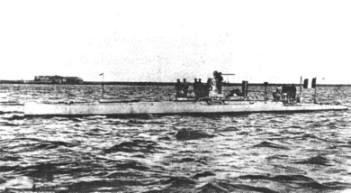
- French submarine Narval in 1900

History

France
- Name: Narval
- Namesake: The Narwhal
- Ordered: 1 June 1898
- Builder: Arsenal de Cherbourg
- Laid down: 23 November 1898
- Launched: 21 October 1899
- Commissioned: 26 June 1900
- Stricken: 1909
- Fate: Sold for scrap, 2 June 1920

General characteristics (as built)
- Class & type: unique vessel
- Displacement: 117 t (115 long tons) (surfaced); 202 t (199 long tons) (submerged)
- Length: 34 m (111 ft 7 in) (o/a)
- Beam: 3.80 m (12 ft 6 in)
- Draft: 1.86 m (6 ft 1 in)
- Installed power: 1 × Adolphe-Seigle steam boiler, 220 ihp/80 shp; electric batteries, 8600 volts
- Propulsion: 1 × shaft; 1 × Brule Triple-expansion steam engine; 2 × Hillairet-Huguet electric motors
- Speed: 9.88 knots (18.30 km/h; 11.37 mph) (surfaced); 5.30 knots (9.82 km/h; 6.10 mph) (submerged)
- Range: 345 nmi (639 km; 397 mi) at 8.83 knots (16.35 km/h; 10.16 mph) (surfaced); 58 nmi (107 km; 67 mi) at 2.83 knots (5.24 km/h; 3.26 mph) (submerged)
- Complement: 2 officers and 12 crewmen
- Armament: 4 × 450 mm (17.7 in) torpedoes in; 4 × single Drzewiecki drop collars

French submarine Narval (“Narwhal”) was a pioneering vessel of the French Navy, designed by Maxime Laubeuf and built at the end of the 19th century. She was designed in response to a competition set by the French Admiralty and had several revolutionary features which set the pattern for submarines for the next 50 years.

== Background ==
During the 19th century the French navy was a pioneer in submarine design. From the first practical submarine, Nautilus, in 1800, and the first mechanically powered submarine, Plongeur, in 1863, France had shown a keen interest in submarines as a way of off-setting the naval superiority of her nearest neighbour, Britain.

In 1886 France had built Gymnote, the first electrically powered submarine, solving the problem of a reliable underwater propulsion system. This was followed with Sirene, an enlarged version of Gymnote (and renamed Gustave Zédé in 1891 honour of her designer), and Morse, with an experimental bronze alloy hull.

All these and all submarines of the time suffered from two major drawbacks; the optimum features for operating underwater were disadvantages on the surface. The rounded pressure hull, designed to best resist water pressure while submerged, was unhandy on the surface and the early submarines were indifferent sailers. The electric propulsion, safe and efficient underwater, gave limited range and speed on the surface, restricting the submarine to operations near the coast. It was these two disadvantages Laubeuf sought to overcome.

== Design ==
In 1896 the French Admiralty announced an open competition for a new design, specifying a vessel not larger than 200 tons, with a surface range of 100 nautical miles and a speed of 12 knots, with a submerged range of 10 nautical miles and a speed of 8 knots. It received 19 designs, of which Laubeuf's Narval won hands down.

To address the problem of the pressure hull's handling on the surface, Laubeuf used a double-hull design, enclosing the rounded pressure hull (containing the crew and machinery) in a more boat-shaped outer hull, which was unpressurized, the space between given over to those features such as the ballast tanks, fuel tanks, which did not require pressurizing, or simply left open to the water when submerged. This gave a better hydrodynamic shape and led to improved handling on the surface.

For the lack of range and speed on the surface given by an underwater propulsion system, Laubeuf took a similar approach, providing separate power plants for surface and submerged propulsion. He continued with electric motor for underwater operation, but added a more efficient engine for the surface. This had the added advantage of allowing for the electric batteries to be re-charged while running on the surface, via dynamos running off the surface engine. This approach had been used before; Garrat's Resurgam in 1878 had used a steam engine on the surface, which had been used to pressurize steam to drive it underwater, and his partner Nordenfelt had continued with this approach; while Laubeuf's contemporary, JP Holland in the United States, had used a petrol engine for surface propulsion combined with electric when submerged for his submarine series.

Laubeuf rejected the petrol engine, deeming it too dangerous for use at sea, opting for a 225 hp Brule steam engine with an oil-fired Temple boiler, combined with a double Hillairet-Huguet electric motor giving 86 volts. This, and the improved hull shape, offered a surface range and speed of 345 nautical miles at 8.8 knots, with a maximum speed of 9.8 knots, and an underwater range of 58 nm at 2.8 Knots, with a maximum of 5.3 knots, with which the Admiralty were satisfied. Her hull shape also gave her a comfortable reserve of buoyancy, some 42%, which compared well to that of Holland's single-hulled electric boats, which remained at 2-3%.

== Service career ==
Narval, c. 1909

Narval was placed on order by the French Navy on 6 January 1898 and laid down at the Arsenal de Cherbourg on 23 November the same year. She was launched on 21 October 1899 and was completed on 26th of that month. She began testing and made her first dive on 3 February 1900. She was commissioned after trials on 26 June 1900 and given the pennant number Q4.

Narval remained in service until 9 March 1909 when she was stricken, and was finally sold for scrap in February 1920. Narval's chief disadvantage was her diving time; shutting down the steam boiler and allowing it to cool before diving created a delay of up to 21 minutes. While this was reduced to 12 minutes later in Narval career, and Laubeuf reduced it further in later designs, it remained a drawback in steam-powered submarines which was only alleviated when a suitable diesel engine was developed for submarines in the early 20th century, allowing for a change in surface propulsion.

Narval was the template for a series of submarines by Laubeuf, built by and for the French Navy, and her double-hull and dual propulsion design, described as "epoch-making" was widely adopted by other French designers and by all major European navies. It set the standard for submarine design throughout the First and Second World Wars remained so until the advent of the teardrop hulled nuclear submarine of the 1950s.
