= French cruiser Fabert =

- Fabert's sister ship Sané in port, date unknown

History

France
- Name: Fabert
- Builder: Rochefort Arsenal
- Laid down: 1 March 1868
- Launched: 1 August 1874
- Commissioned: 20 July 1875
- Stricken: 25 November 1899
- Fate: Sold, August 1903

General characteristics
- Class & type: Sané-class cruiser
- Displacement: 1,943 t (1,912 long tons; 2,142 short tons)
- Length: 81.51 m (267 ft 5 in) loa
- Beam: 11.01 m (36 ft 1 in)
- Draft: 5.52 m (18 ft 1 in) (max)
- Installed power: 4 × fire-tube boilers; 1,800–2,000 ihp (1,300–1,500 kW)
- Propulsion: 1 × compound engine; 1 × screw propeller
- Sail plan: Barque rig
- Speed: 15 knots (28 km/h; 17 mph)
- Range: 6,140 nmi (11,370 km; 7,070 mi) at 10 knots (19 km/h; 12 mph)
- Complement: 206
- Armament: 8 × 138.6 mm (5.46 in) guns

Fabert was an unprotected cruiser built for the French Navy in the late 1860s and early 1870s, second of three ships in the Sané class.

== Design ==
Fabert was 81.51 m (267 ft 5 in) long overall, and she had a beam of 11.01 m (36 ft 1 in). She had an average draft of 4.84 m (15 ft 11 in) that was at most 5.52 m (18 ft 1 in) at the stern, and she displaced 1,943 t (1,912 long tons; 2,142 short tons). She had a wooden hull with a straight stem. Her normal crew numbered 206 officers and sailors.

The ship's propulsion system consisted of a single horizontal compound engine that drove a single screw propeller. Steam for the engine was provided by four coal-burning fire-tube boilers, which were vented through a funnel located amidships. The propulsion system was designed to produce 1,800 to 2,000 indicated horsepower (1,300 to 1,500 kW) for a top speed of around 15 knots (28 km/h; 17 mph). In service, the three Sané reached speeds of between 14.47 and 15 knots (26.80 and 27.78 km/h; 16.65 and 17.26 mph). Coal storage amounted to 336 t (331 long tons; 370 short tons), which allowed the ships to steam for up to 6,140 nautical miles (11,370 km; 7,070 mi) at a cruising speed of 10 knots (19 km/h; 12 mph). The ship was fitted with a three-masted barque rig to supplement the steam engine on long voyages abroad.

Fabert was completed with a uniform battery of eight 138.6 mm (5.46 in) guns. Two of the guns were placed on rotating pivot mounts, one forward and the other aft. The remaining six guns were placed amidships, firing through embrasures in the bulwarks, three guns per broadside. In addition, she carried three 86.5 mm (3.41 in) bronze cannon for use aboard the ship's boats.

== Service history ==
Fabert was laid down on 1 March 1868 at the Rochefort Arsenal. After a very lengthy construction process, she was launched on 1 August 1874, after which fitting-out work commenced. The ship was commissioned for sea trials on 20 July 1875, which were completed in December that year. The ship was placed in reserve status on about 19 December, and she remained out of active service for nearly two years. On 25 October 1877, Fabert was recommissioned for a deployment to the Indian Ocean to protect French colonial interests in the region.

By 1882, Fabert had been moved to the Antilles. She was joined there by the old screw frigate Magicienne, the cruiser Rigault de Genouilly, and the aviso Chasseur. In February 1885, Fabert was taken into the Rochefort Arsenal to have her worn-out boilers replaced. The following year, Fabert was deployed to the Pacific station. At that time, the unit also included the cruisers Bourayne, Magon, Decrès, and Duquesne. Fabert remained on the Pacific station through 1887, along with Duquesne and Decrès, the other cruisers having been withdrawn by then. Fabert remained in the area into 1889, by which time the unit consisted of Duquesne, the cruisers Volta and Champlain, and two armed transport ships.

The ship underwent another refit in 1890 at the Cherbourg Arsenal to have her main guns relocated. The following year, Fabert was mobilized at Cherbourg to take part in the annual fleet maneuvers in June and July that year. At the time, the other ships at Cherbourg included the ironclad Turenne, the coastal defense ships Vengeur, Tonnerre, and Tonnant, the unprotected cruiser Duguay-Trouin, the torpedo cruiser Epervier, and several smaller vessels. They did not participate in formal maneuvers, and each vessel went to sea individually to train their crews.

Fabert was placed in reserve for the duration of 1891. Another shipyard period followed from 1893 to 1894, which included the installation of her new bridge and new boilers. Fabert was sent abroad again in 1897, this time to the Indian Ocean, where she relieved the cruiser Dupetit-Thouars. The unit there also included the Lapérouse and two of gunboats.

Fabert was struck from the naval register on 25 November 1899, thereafter being reduced to a training ship for naval cadets, based in Marseille. The school was closed in 1903 and Fabert was sold to ship breakers in Marseille in August that year.
