= Duquesne-class cruiser (1876) =

Group of cruisers built in the 19th century for the French Navy

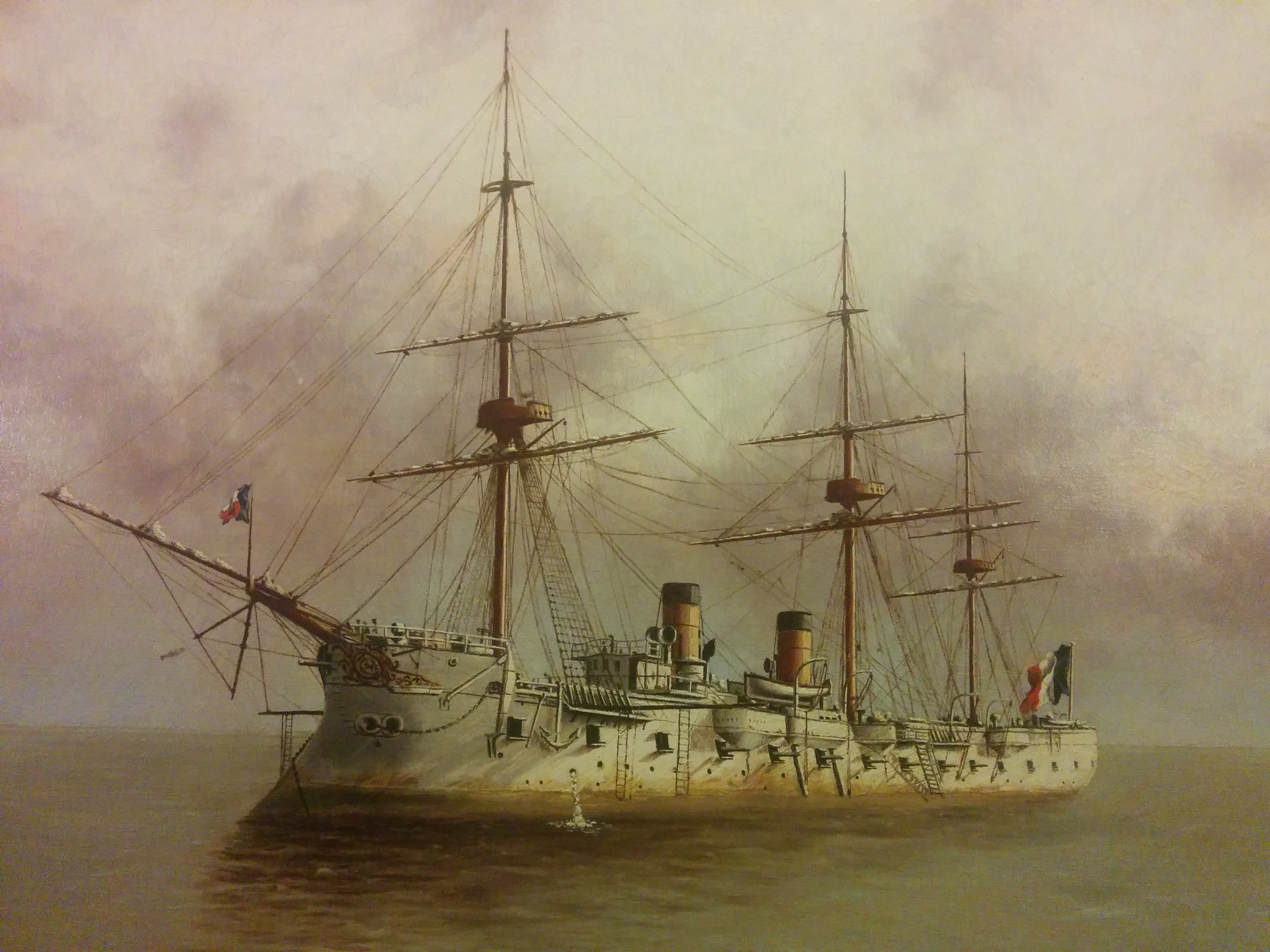
- Painting of Duquesne

Class overview
- Preceded by: Rigault de Genouilly class
- Succeeded by: Duguay-Trouin

General characteristics
- Class & type: Duquesne class
- Displacement: 5,824 t (5,732 long tons; 6,420 short tons)
- Length: 99.64 m (326 ft 11 in)
- Beam: 15.56 m (51 ft 1 in)
- Draft: 7.14 m (23 ft 5 in)
- Installed power: 12 × fire-tube boilers; 7,200 ihp (5,400 kW)
- Propulsion: 2 × marine steam engines; 1 × screw propeller
- Sail plan: Full ship rig
- Speed: 16.85 knots (31.21 km/h; 19.39 mph)
- Range: 6,680 nautical miles (12,370 km; 7,690 mi) at 10 knots (19 km/h; 12 mph)
- Complement: 551
- Armament: 7 × 194 mm (7.6 in) guns; 14 × 138.6 mm (5.46 in) guns; 6 × 37 mm (1.5 in) Hotchkiss revolver cannon

The Duquesne class was a group of two unprotected cruisers built for the French Navy in the 1870s. The class comprised two ships: Duquesne and Tourville. They were ordered in the aftermath of the Franco-Prussian War, and were intended for use against commerce raiders, which necessitated a high top speed, heavy armament, and long cruising radius. Both ships' engines proved to be very unreliable, required significant maintenance to keep in operation, and burned coal voraciously. Their large crews also increased the cost of operating the vessels, and all of these problems led to short service lives. Over the course of the twenty-five years following their launch, Duquesne saw active service for just seven years, while Tourville was in commission for only four. The former made a single deployment overseas in the mid-1880s, when she cruised on the Pacific station for three years, while Tourville spent just a year in the Far East before being recalled. Both ships were struck from the naval register in 1901 and sold for scrap thereafter.

== Design ==
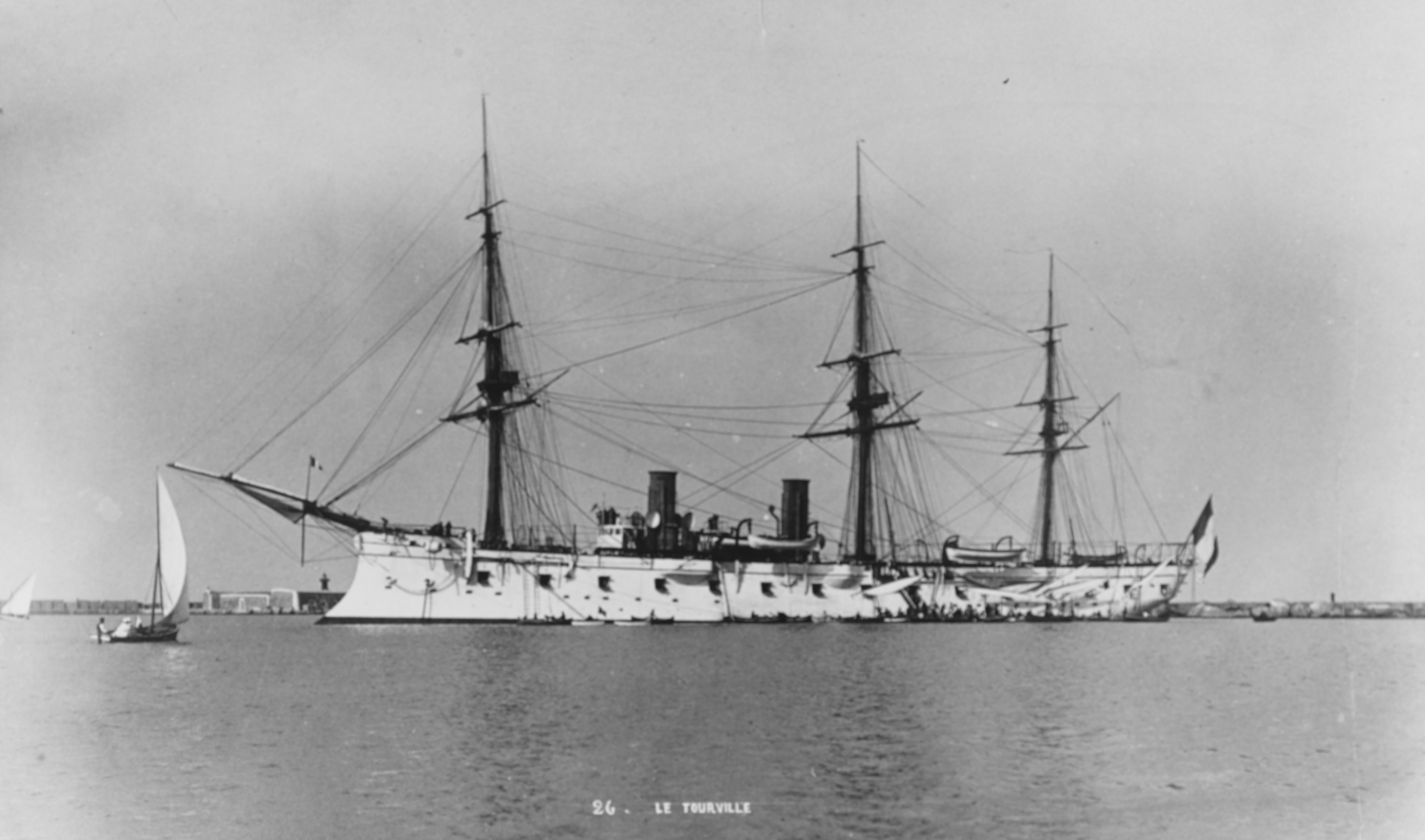
Tourville probably in the 1880s

In the late 1860s, the major European navies saw the success that Confederate commerce raiders had had during the American Civil War, and decided to respond with larger, faster cruisers that could catch such raiders. France's construction program was delayed by the Franco-Prussian War of 1870–1871, but the navy quickly began preparations for the 1872 fiscal year. On 16 December 1871, the Conseil des Travaux (Council of Works) issued a set of specifications for a new first-class cruiser design: it must reach a speed of 17 knots (31 km/h; 20 mph), be able to cruise for 5,000 nautical miles (9,300 km; 5,800 mi) at a speed of 10 knots (19 km/h; 12 mph), incorporate an iron hull that was sheathed in wood and copper, include a full ship rig for long-distance sailing, on a displacement of around 4,800 metric tons (4,700 long tons; 5,300 short tons). Furthermore, the ship would require a relatively heavy armament to be able to defeat an enemy cruiser, and a large gun must be placed forward so that it could fire warning shots to compel a hostile merchant vessel to stop.

The naval minister, Louis Pothuau, revised the specifications in early 1872, requesting an armament of five 164.7 mm (6.48 in) guns and sixteen 138.6 mm (5.46 in) guns, and he increased the displacement limit to 5,400 t (5,300 long tons; 6,000 short tons). He forwarded these details to the shipyards that would prepare designs on 23 January. The Conseil criticized the increase in size, arguing that it would significantly increase the cost of the new vessels and the improvements thereby attained did not warrant the cost. Five shipyards submitted proposals, which the Conseil reviewed on 13 August; they selected the design submitted by Alfred Lebelin de Dionne, though they requested he increase the beam to improve the ships' stability. Pothuau approved the plans on 13 February 1873. Changes to the design were made during construction, including increasing the caliber of the main battery to 194 mm (7.6 in), and the number of guns to seven, at the cost of two of the 138.6 mm guns.

In service, the ships proved to be disappointments, as they were expensive to operate owing to their great size, though they compared well to their foreign contemporaries. They also suffered from significant problems with their propulsion systems that cut their active careers short. Duquesne would only see seven years of active service, while Tourville was in commission for just four years. They were also too expensive in terms of cost of construction, which prevented more than two of the vessels—Duquesne and Tourville—from being built. A third ship, with the contract name "N", appeared on the 1874 program, again in the 1875 budget, but was never built and thereafter did not appear in French naval programs. Duquesne and Tourville are sometimes considered to be different classes, but they were built to the same design and different only in the arrangement of their propulsion system.

=== General characteristics and machinery ===
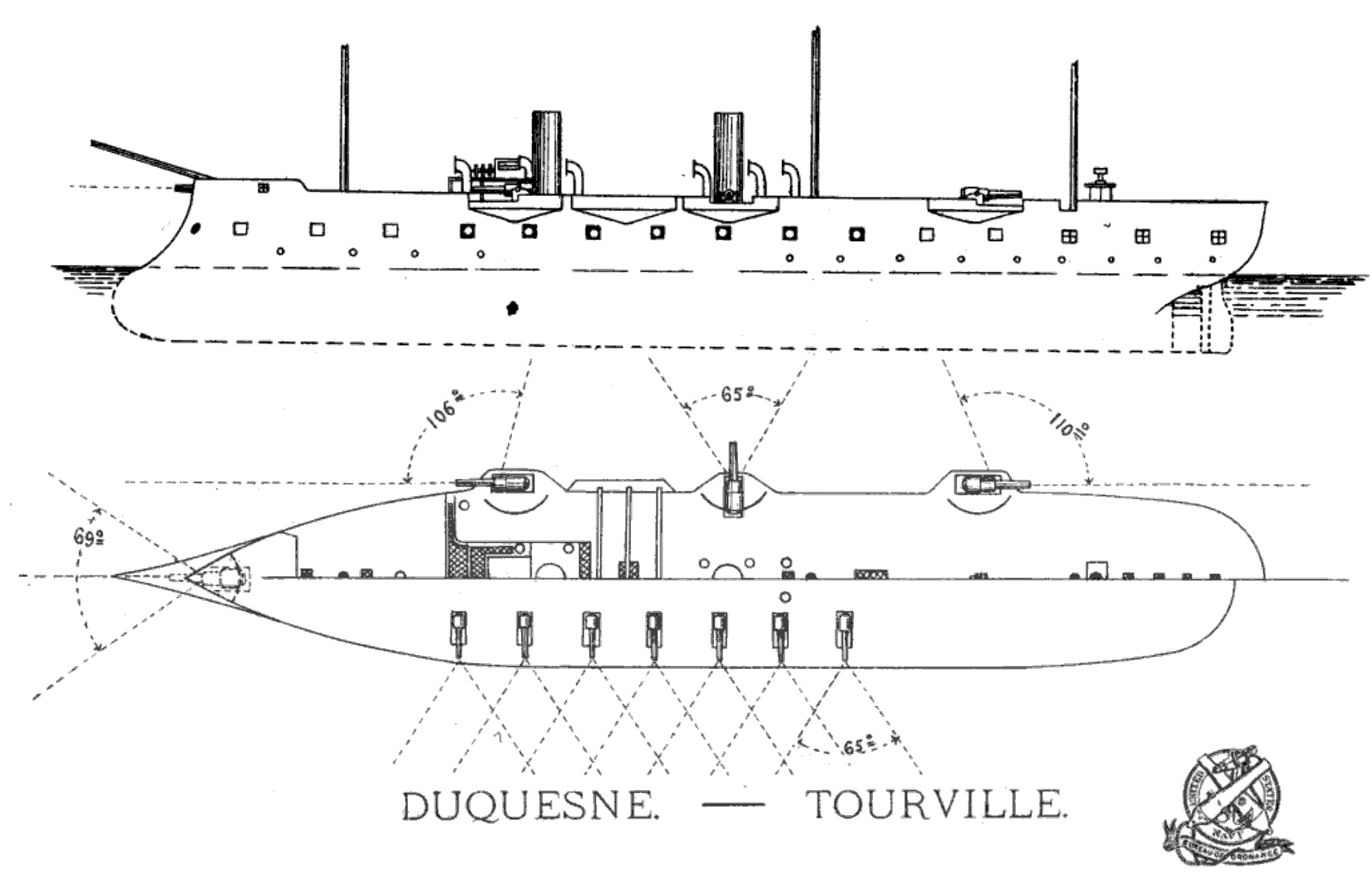
Plan and profile of the Duquesne class

The two Duquesne-class cruisers were iron-hulled vessels that were 99.64 m (326 ft 11 in) long at the waterline and 101.58 m (333 ft 3 in) long between perpendiculars, with a beam of 15.56 m (51 ft 1 in). They had an average draft of 7.14 m (23 ft 5 in) on a displacement of 5,824 t (5,732 long tons; 6,420 short tons) as designed. The ships had a ram bow and an overhanging stern. Their hulls were sheathed with wood to protect them from marine biofouling on long voyages overseas, and they were divided into nine watertight compartments, along with a double bottom. Their crew amounted to 540–551 officers and enlisted men.

The ships' propulsion system consisted of a pair of compound steam engines driving a screw propeller. The engines were arranged in tandem, driving the same propeller shaft; the intent was for the forward engine to be used for high-speed steaming and the aft engine would be used for cruising at more economical speeds. Steam was provided by twelve rectangular, coal-burning fire-tube boilers that were ducted into a pair of funnels placed amidships. They had a full ship rig to supplement their steam engine on long voyages overseas, and their funnels could be retracted to allow full use of the sails.

Their machinery was rated to produce 7,200 indicated horsepower (5,400 kW) for a top speed of 16.85 knots (31.21 km/h; 19.39 mph). Coal storage amounted to 726.9 t (715.4 long tons; 801.3 short tons), and at a more economical speed of 10 knots (19 km/h; 12 mph), the ship could steam for 6,680 nautical miles (12,370 km; 7,690 mi). Both ships' propulsion systems proved to be very troublesome in service, both in terms of reliability and economy. The engines on both vessels broke down frequently and required frequent lubrication to keep running, and the boilers burned coal at a prodigious rate; all of these problems militated against the long overseas voyages for which they had been designed.

=== Armament ===
The ships were armed with a main battery of seven 194 mm (7.6 in) M1870 19.8-caliber guns; three guns were placed on each broadside in sponsons on the upper deck, and the seventh gun was placed in the forecastle as a chase gun. These were supported by a secondary battery of fourteen 138.6 mm (5.46 in) M1870 guns, which were placed in a gun battery amidships, seven guns per broadside. Six 37 mm (1.5 in) Hotchkiss revolver cannon provided close-range defense against torpedo boats for Duquesne, while Tourville received only four of these guns. Duquesne also carried four 86.5 mm (3.41 in) bronze cannon and a single 121 mm (4.8 in) bronze cannon that could be sent ashore with a landing party or used to arm the ship's boats, though Tourville did not carry any of these guns.

== Ships ==
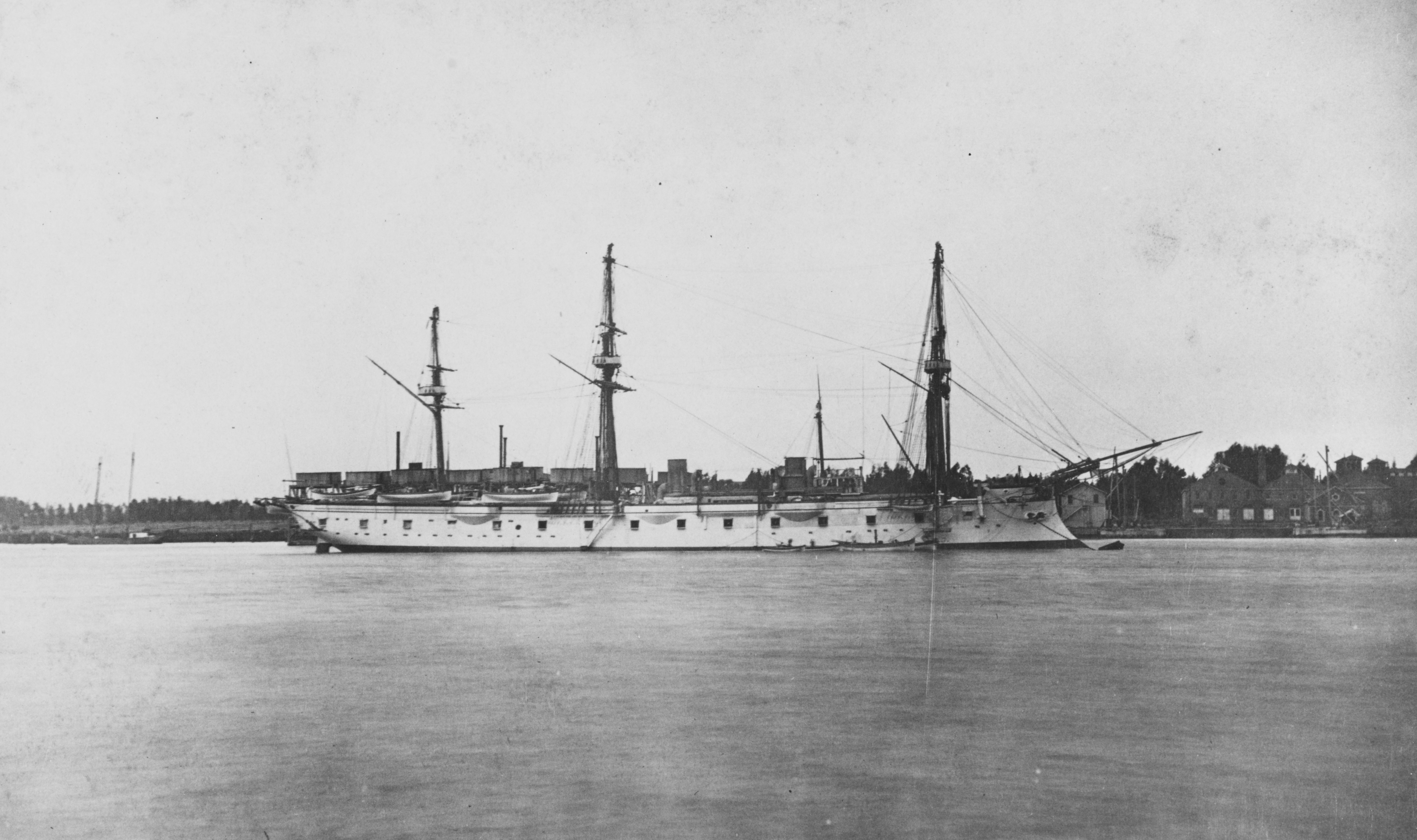
Duquesne off the Mare Island Naval Shipyard, United States, around 1889

Construction data
| Name | Laid down | Launched | Commissioned | Shipyard |
|---|---|---|---|---|
| Duquesne | 18 June 1873 | 11 March 1876 | 20 January 1878 | Arsenal de Rochefort, Rochefort |
| Tourville | 23 February 1874 | 24 February 1876 | 17 August 1876 | Société Nouvelle des Forges et Chantiers de la Méditerranée, La Seyne |
| N | — | — | — | |

== Service history ==
Because of the ships' unreliable engines, they saw little active service. After being completed in the late 1870s, both vessels were briefly used in experimental operations with the main fleet before being laid up into the early 1880s. Tourville was commissioned in 1881 to take part in the French conquest of Tunisia, but was laid up again thereafter. She was recommissioned in 1883 for a short deployment to East Asia, but her deep draft and the cost of operating her there led to her replacement by other cruisers. As a result, she saw no action during the Tonkin campaign, France's effort to seize control of northern Vietnam. Duquesne was commissioned in 1885 for a deployment to the Pacific station. She cruised the Pacific for the next three years, during which time her wood and copper-sheathed hull protected her from significant fouling. Both ships were modernized in the early and mid-1890s, receiving new quick-firing guns, and in 1894 and 1895, Duquesne served in the Atlantic Division. Both ships were struck from the naval register in 1901; Tourville was sold to ship breakers in 1903 and Duquesne was sold for scrap in 1908.
