= French cruiser Tourville (1876) =

French naval vessel

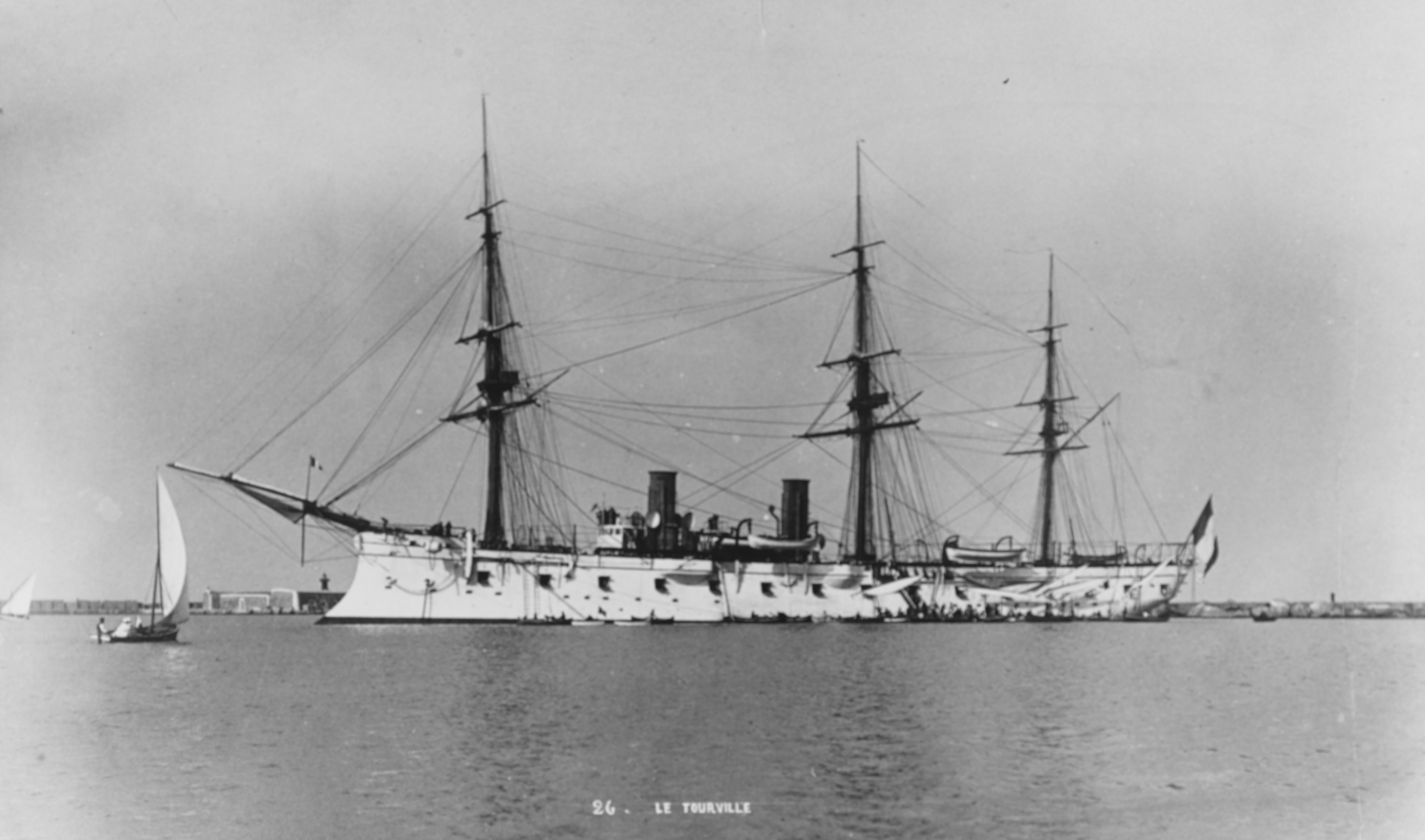
- Tourville probably in the mid-1880s

History

France
- Name: Tourville
- Builder: Société Nouvelle des Forges et Chantiers de la Méditerranée
- Laid down: 23 February 1874
- Launched: 24 February 1876
- Commissioned: 17 August 1876
- Stricken: 4 December 1901
- Fate: Sold for scrap, 20 November 1903

General characteristics
- Class & type: Duquesne-class cruiser
- Displacement: 5,824 t (5,732 long tons; 6,420 short tons)
- Length: 99.64 m (326 ft 11 in)
- Beam: 15.56 m (51 ft 1 in)
- Draft: 7.14 m (23 ft 5 in)
- Installed power: 12 × fire-tube boilers; 7,200 ihp (5,400 kW)
- Propulsion: 2 × marine steam engines; 1 × screw propeller
- Sail plan: Full ship rig
- Speed: 16.85 knots (31.21 km/h; 19.39 mph)
- Range: 6,680 nautical miles (12,370 km; 7,690 mi) at 10 knots (19 km/h; 12 mph)
- Complement: 551
- Armament: 7 × 194 mm (7.6 in) guns; 14 × 138.6 mm (5.46 in) guns; 6 × 37 mm (1.5 in) Hotchkiss revolver cannon

Tourville was an unprotected cruiser of the Duquesne class built for the French Navy in the 1870s. She was ordered in the aftermath of the Franco-Prussian War, and was intended for use against commerce raiders, which necessitated a high top speed, heavy armament, and long cruising radius. The ship's engines proved to be very unreliable, and coupled with the high cost of operating the vessel, she proved to be a disappointment in service. As a result, she saw just four years of active service during her more than twenty-five years of existence. She took part in the French conquest of Tunisia in 1881 and was sent to East Asia in 1883, but saw no action during the Tonkin campaign, being recalled early the next year, to be replaced by more capable cruisers that were cheaper to operate. She saw no further service and was struck from the naval register in 1901 and was sold for scrap in 1903.

== Design ==
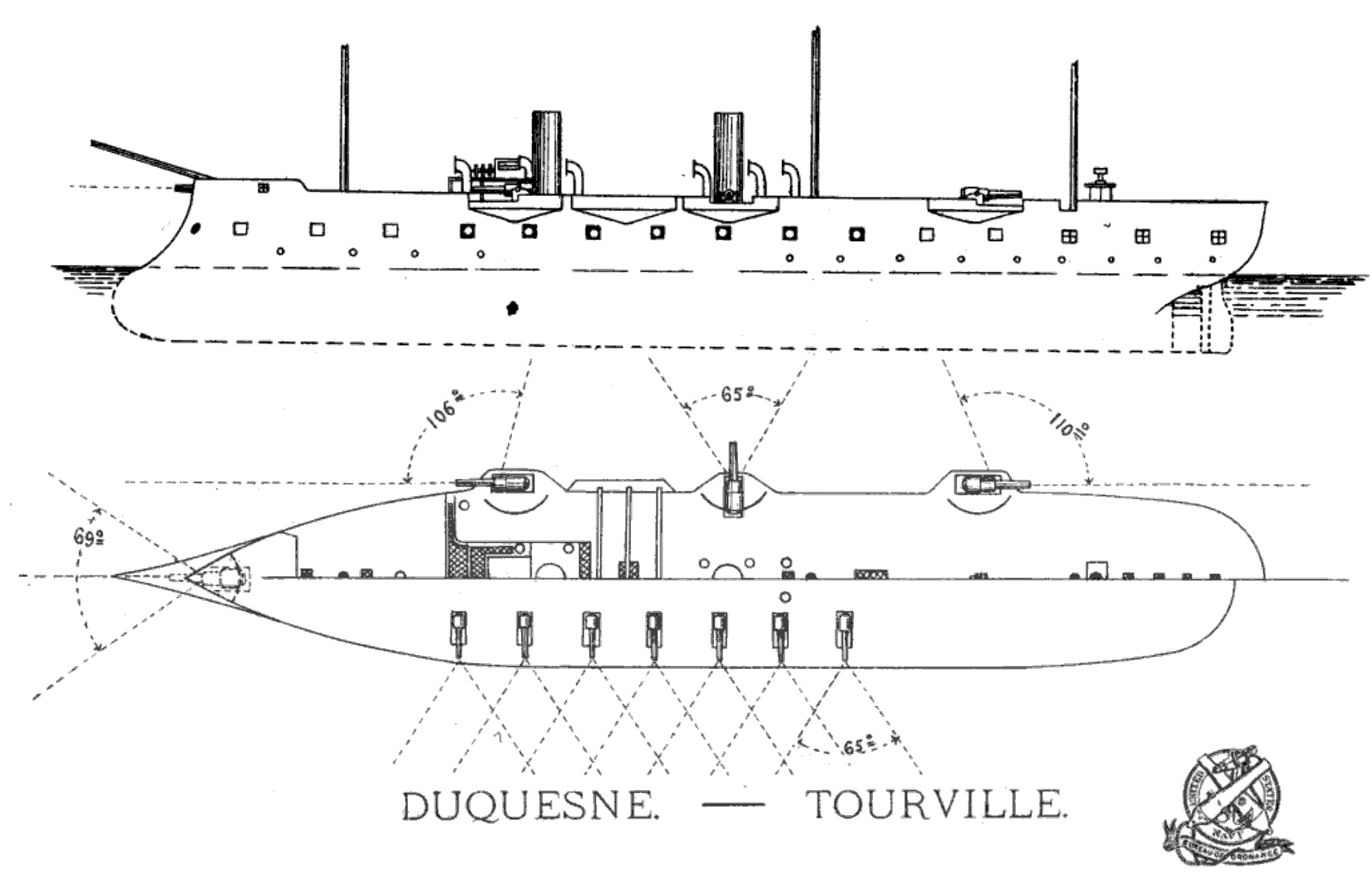
Plan and profile of the Duquesne class

The two ships of the Duquesne class of unprotected cruisers were ordered during the administration of Louis Pothuau in response to the success of Confederate commerce raiders during the American Civil War. The intent was for the new vessels to be fast enough to catch enemy raiders and powerful enough to defeat them, and to have the endurance to operate abroad for extended periods of time. In service, the ships proved to be disappointments, owing to the great cost to operate them and the unreliability of their engines, which required significant maintenance to keep running. As a result, they had fairly short active careers. Tourville and Duquesne are sometimes considered to be different classes, but they were built to the same design by Alfred Lebelin de Dionne and different only in the arrangement of their propulsion system.

Tourville was 99.64 m (326 ft 11 in) long at the waterline, with a beam of 15.56 m (51 ft 1 in) and an average draft of 7.14 m (23 ft 5 in). She displaced 5,824 t (5,732 long tons; 6,420 short tons) as designed. The ship had a short forecastle deck, a ram bow, and an overhanging stern. Her crew amounted to 551 officers and enlisted men. The ship's propulsion system consisted of a pair of compound steam engines driving a single screw propeller. Steam was provided by twelve coal-burning fire-tube boilers that were ducted into a pair of funnels placed amidships. Her machinery was rated to produce 7,200 indicated horsepower (5,400 kW) for a top speed of 16.9 knots (31.3 km/h; 19.4 mph). At a more economical speed of 10 knots (19 km/h; 12 mph), the ship could steam for 7,570 nautical miles (14,020 km; 8,710 mi). She had a full ship rig to supplement her steam engine on long voyages overseas.

The ship was armed with a main battery of seven 194 mm (7.6 in) M1870 guns; three guns were placed on each broadside in sponsons, and the seventh gun was placed in the forecastle as a chase gun. These were supported by a secondary battery of fourteen 138.6 mm (5.46 in) M1870 guns, which were placed in a gun battery amidships, seven guns per broadside. Four 37 mm (1.5 in) Hotchkiss revolver cannon provided close-range defense against torpedo boats.

=== Modifications ===
Tourville received her first modification in 1883, which included the installation of four additional 37 mm guns, and she received two 65 mm (2.6 in) field guns for use by landing parties. In 1896, the navy approved a plan to reconstruct Tourville extensively, including lengthening her hull by 5.5 m (18 ft) to refine her hull lines aft, install an entirely new, two-screw propulsion system. The cost of the modernization convinced the navy to cancel the project before work began, and instead her armament was simply replaced. Her original main and secondary batteries were replaced with seven 164.7 mm (6.48 in) M1881 quick-firing guns (QF) and fourteen 138.6 mm M1881 QF guns, and she received a pair of 65 mm QF guns.

== Service history ==
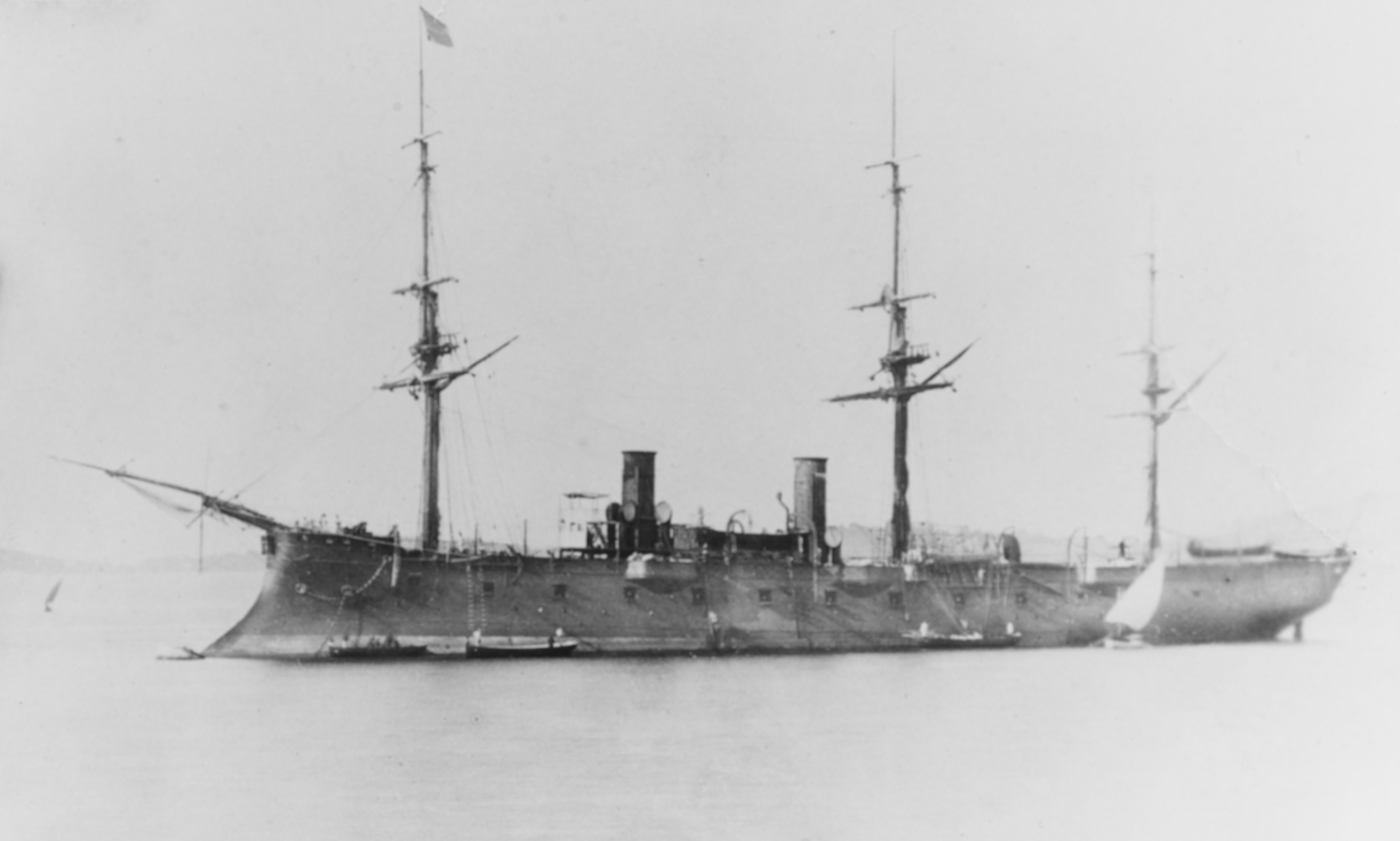
Tourville at anchor, date unknown

Tourville was laid down on 23 February 1874 at the Société Nouvelle des Forges et Chantiers de la Méditerranée shipyard in La Seyne. She was launched on 24 February 1876 and was commissioned to begin sea trials just six months later on 17 August. The ship was not yet complete at that time, and work on her engines continued until 1 September. Her initial trials lasted a year and a half due to her troublesome engines, and on 5 March 1878, after the testing was completed, she was reduced to the 2nd category of reserve. She was placed in full commission on 4 July 1879 for experimental operations with the main fleet in home waters before being decommissioned again on 7 October. Her engines were then entirely rebuilt in an attempt to solve the problems with them, work lasting from 20 October 1879 to 5 January 1881. Nevertheless, her engines remained prone to breakdowns, and she only served four years of active service over the duration of her career.

On 15 January 1881, Tourville was recommissioned to take part in the planned invasion of Tunisia later that year. In April, the French cited border clashes between Tunisian forces and soldiers stationed in French Algeria as a pretext to invade the country; the navy supported an attack by 30,000 French troops that quickly seized control of the country and forced the government of Muhammad III as-Sadiq to agree to a French protectorate. Tourville was thereafter decommissioned until 25 May 1883, when she returned to service for a deployment to East Asia, where France had embarked on the Tonkin campaign to seize control of northern Vietnam. Tourville did not remain on the station for very long, owing to the cost of operating the cruiser there, coupled with her deep draft, which prevented her from operating in the shallow coastal waters in the region. The unprotected cruisers Duguay-Trouin and D'Estaing were sent to relieve her. By early 1884, Tourville had been sent back to France; she passed through the Suez Canal on the voyage home.

During the Fashoda Crisis in 1898, some consideration was given to disarming Duquesne and Tourville and using the guns to arm the new pre-dreadnought battleships Gaulois and Charlemagne, which were complete except for their armament. But the crisis passed and the plan came to nothing. Tourville saw no further active service and was struck from the naval register on 4 December 1901, but was kept in the navy's inventory for use in experiments with devices to transfer coal at sea. She was listed for sale on 8 June 1903 and was sold to ship breakers on 20 November.
