= French cruiser Duquesne (1876) =

French naval vessel

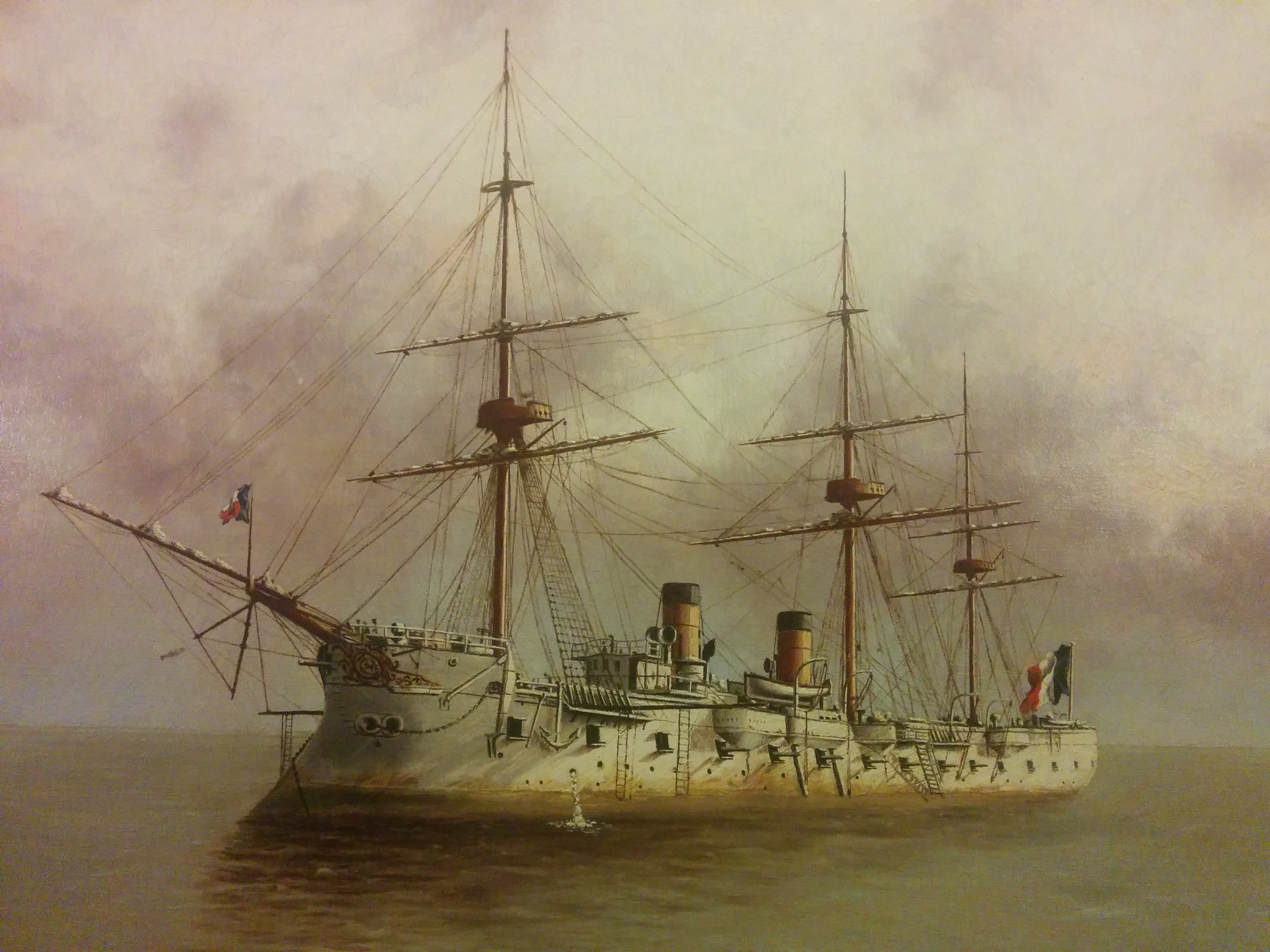
- Painting of Duquesne

History

France
- Name: Duquesne
- Builder: Arsenal de Rochefort
- Laid down: 18 June 1873
- Launched: 11 March 1876
- Commissioned: 20 January 1878
- Stricken: 4 December 1901
- Fate: Sold for scrap, 2 March 1908

General characteristics
- Class & type: Duquesne-class cruiser
- Displacement: 5,824 t (5,732 long tons; 6,420 short tons)
- Length: 99.64 m (326 ft 11 in)
- Beam: 15.56 m (51 ft 1 in)
- Draft: 7.14 m (23 ft 5 in)
- Installed power: 12 × fire-tube boilers; 7,200 ihp (5,400 kW)
- Propulsion: 2 × marine steam engines; 1 × screw propeller
- Sail plan: Full ship rig
- Speed: 16.85 knots (31.21 km/h; 19.39 mph)
- Range: 6,680 nautical miles (12,370 km; 7,690 mi) at 10 knots (19 km/h; 12 mph)
- Complement: 551
- Armament: 7 × 194 mm (7.6 in) guns; 14 × 138.6 mm (5.46 in) guns; 6 × 37 mm (1.5 in) Hotchkiss revolver cannon

Duquesne was an unprotected cruiser built for the French Navy in the 1870s, the lead ship of the Duquesne class. She was ordered in the aftermath of the Franco-Prussian War, and was intended for use against commerce raiders, which necessitated a high top speed, heavy armament, and long cruising radius. The ship's engines proved to be very unreliable, and coupled with the high cost of operating the vessel, she proved to be a disappointment in service. As a result, she saw limited use; she had one major overseas deployment in the mid-1880s, during which time she cruised in the Pacific Ocean. She operated with the Atlantic Division in 1894 and 1895, but saw no further service. She was struck from the naval register in 1901 and was sold for scrap in 1908.

== Design ==
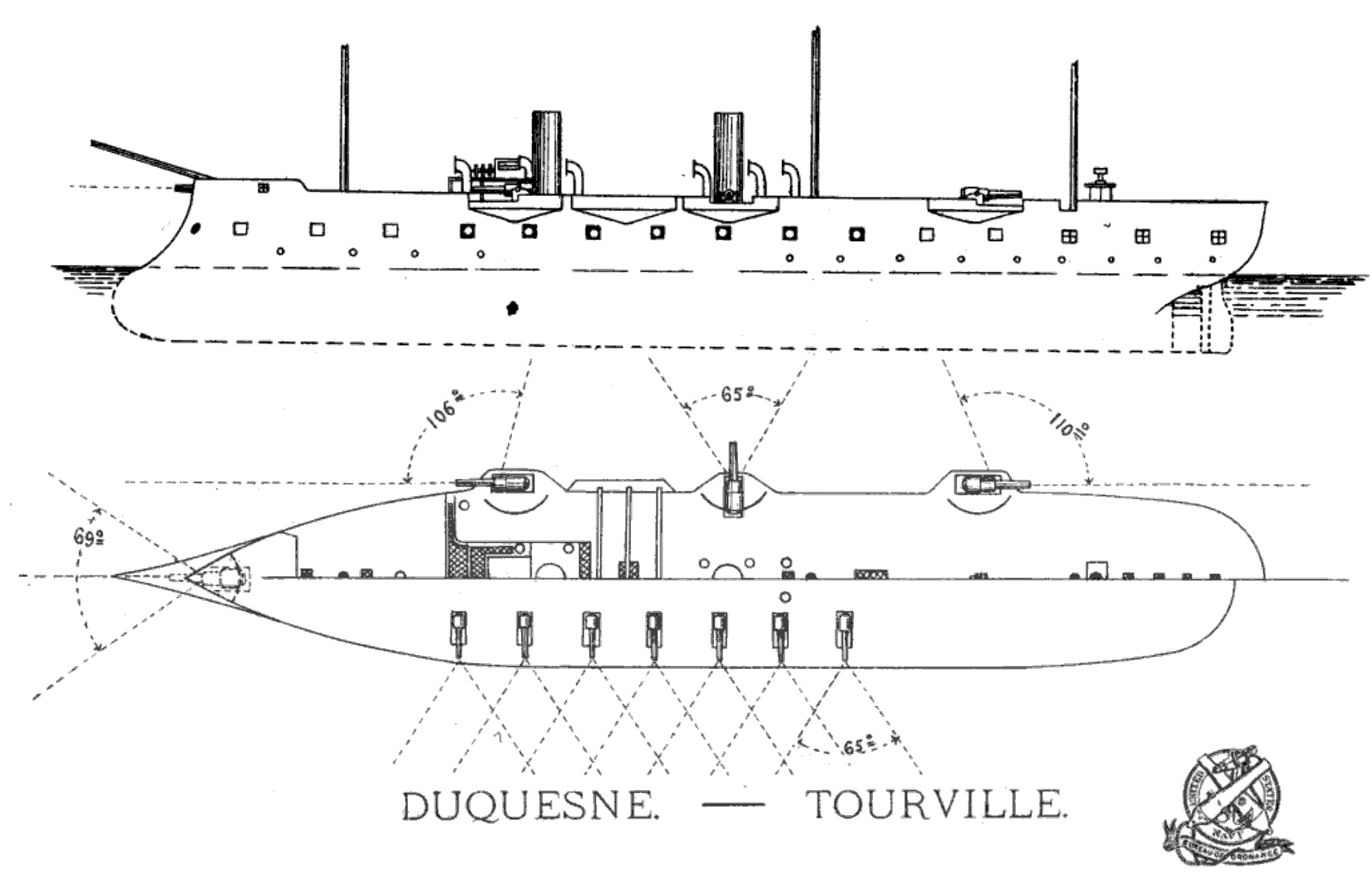
Plan and profile of the Duquesne class

The two ships of the Duquesne class of unprotected cruisers were ordered during the administration of Louis Pothuau in response to the success of Confederate commerce raiders during the American Civil War. The intent was for the new vessels to be fast enough to catch enemy raiders and powerful enough to defeat them, and to have the endurance to operate abroad for extended periods of time. In service, the ships proved to be disappointments, owing to the great cost to operate them and the unreliability of their engines, which required significant maintenance to keep running. As a result, they had fairly short active careers. Duquesne and Tourville are sometimes considered to be different classes, but they were built to the same design by Alfred Lebelin de Dionne and different only in the arrangement of their propulsion system.

Duquesne was 99.64 m (326 ft 11 in) long at the waterline, with a beam of 15.56 m (51 ft 1 in) and an average draft of 7.14 m (23 ft 5 in). She displaced 5,824 t (5,732 long tons; 6,420 short tons) as designed. The ship had a short forecastle deck, a ram bow, and an overhanging stern. Her crew amounted to 551 officers and enlisted men. The ship's propulsion system consisted of a pair of compound steam engines driving a single screw propeller. Steam was provided by twelve coal-burning fire-tube boilers that were ducted into a pair of funnels placed amidships. Her machinery was rated to produce 7,200 indicated horsepower (5,400 kW) for a top speed of 16.85 knots (31.21 km/h; 19.39 mph). At a more economical speed of 10 knots (19 km/h; 12 mph), the ship could steam for 6,680 nautical miles (12,370 km; 7,690 mi). She had a full ship rig to supplement her steam engine on long voyages overseas.

The ship was armed with a main battery of seven 194 mm (7.6 in) M1870 guns; three guns were placed on each broadside in sponsons, and the seventh gun was placed in the forecastle as a chase gun. These were supported by a secondary battery of fourteen 138.6 mm (5.46 in) M1870 guns, which were placed in a gun battery amidships, seven guns per broadside. Six 37 mm (1.5 in) Hotchkiss revolver cannon provided close-range defense against torpedo boats. She also carried four 86.5 mm (3.41 in) bronze cannon and a single 121 mm (4.8 in) bronze cannon that could be sent ashore with a landing party or used to arm the ship's boats.

=== Modifications ===
In 1886, the ship received an additional eight 37 mm guns, bringing the total to fourteen. In 1893–1894, Duquesne underwent a major reconstruction in an attempt to correct the deficiencies with her propulsion system and modernize her armament. The both sets of engines had their cylinders replaced with narrower cylinders, and she received twelve new cylindrical boilers that had a significantly higher operating pressure, though they were smaller and generated less power, at 5,000 indicated horsepower (3,700 kW). Her original main and secondary batteries were replaced with seven 164.7 mm (6.48 in) M1881 quick-firing guns (QF) and fourteen 138.6 mm M1881 QF guns.

== Service history ==
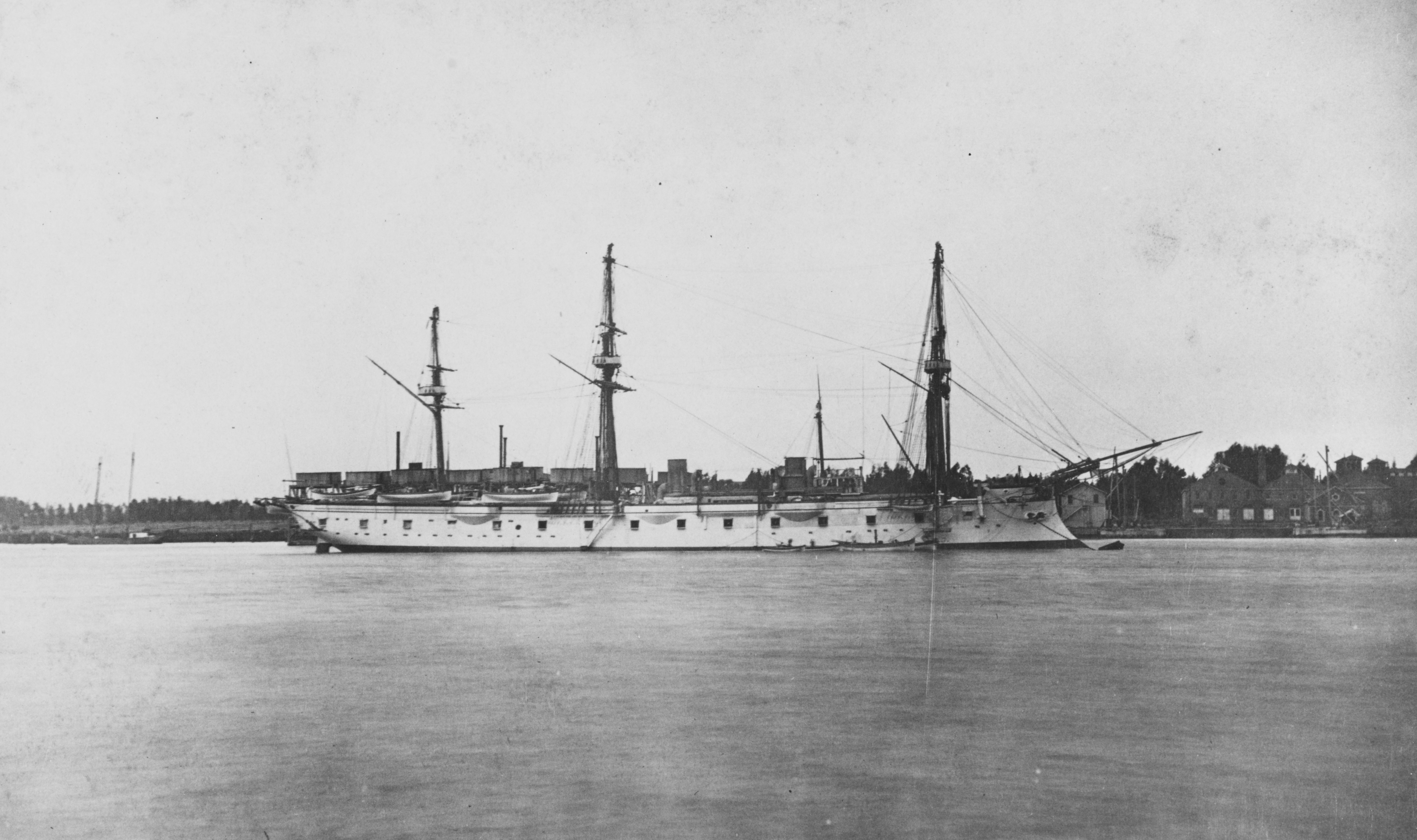
Duquesne off the Mare Island Naval Shipyard, United States, around 1889

The keel for Duquesne was laid down at the Arsenal de Rochefort in Rochefort on 18 June 1873. Her completed hull was launched on 11 March 1876 and she was commissioned to begin sea trials on 20 January 1878, though work on her machinery continued until 14 February, and her initial testing did not begin until 20 May. Her trials were completed on 10 December, when she was placed in the 2nd category of reserve She was recommissioned on 20 June 1879 to operate with the main French fleet experimentally, and she was soon decommissioned again on 20 September. She remained out of service into the early 1880s, during which time she underwent modifications. In January 1884, she was reduced to the 3rd category of reserve.

On 21 December 1885, Duquesne was recommissioned for a deployment to the Pacific station. By the time she arrived the following year, the unit also included the cruisers Bourayne, Magon, Decrès, and Fabert. Duquesne served as the station flagship in 1887, and the composition of the unit had changed little, beyond the departure of Bourayne and Magon. In November 1888, Duquesne was dry docked in San Francisco in the United States after having spent the last two and a half years on the Pacific station. Her wood and copper sheathed hull had protected her from significant marine biofouling, and less than half a ton of fouling was removed.

By 1891, Duquesne had returned to France, where she was taken out of service for a major reconstruction. The modifications included an entirely new armament of quick-firing guns. Work was completed by 1894, and in June, Duquesne was assigned to the Atlantic Division, along with the unprotected cruisers Villars and Beautemps-Beaupré and the aviso Hussard. The following year, the unit consisted of Duquesne, the cruiser Roland, and a sloop.

During the Fashoda Crisis in 1898, some consideration was given to disarming Duquesne and Tourville and using the guns to arm the new pre-dreadnought battleships Gaulois and Charlemagne, which were complete except for their armament. But the crisis passed and the plan came to nothing. Duquesne was struck from the naval register on 4 December 1901, though she remained in the navy's inventory through 1907. She was ultimately sold to ship breakers on 2 March 1908.
