= French cruiser Sané =

- Sané in port, date unknown

History

France
- Name: Sané
- Ordered: 3 September 1866
- Builder: Toulon arsenal
- Laid down: 13 September 1866
- Launched: 9 April 1870
- Commissioned: 6 November 1871
- Stricken: 13 December 1892
- Fate: Sold, c. 1913

General characteristics
- Class & type: Sané-class cruiser
- Displacement: 1,943 t (1,912 long tons; 2,142 short tons)
- Length: 81.51 m (267 ft 5 in) loa
- Beam: 11.01 m (36 ft 1 in)
- Draft: 5.52 m (18 ft 1 in) (max)
- Installed power: 4 × fire-tube boilers; 1,800–2,000 ihp (1,300–1,500 kW)
- Propulsion: 1 × compound engine; 1 × screw propeller
- Sail plan: Barque rig
- Speed: 15 knots (28 km/h; 17 mph)
- Range: 6,140 nmi (11,370 km; 7,070 mi) at 10 knots (19 km/h; 12 mph)
- Complement: 206
- Armament: 6 × 138.6 mm (5.46 in) guns

Sané was an unprotected cruiser built for the French Navy in the late 1860s and early 1870s, the lead ship of the Sané class.

== Design ==
Sané was 81.51 m (267 ft 5 in) long overall, and she had a beam of 11.01 m (36 ft 1 in). She had an average draft of 4.84 m (15 ft 11 in) that was at most 5.52 m (18 ft 1 in) at the stern, and she displaced 1,943 t (1,912 long tons; 2,142 short tons). She had a wooden hull with a straight stem. Her normal crew numbered 206 officers and sailors.

The ship's propulsion system consisted of a single horizontal compound engine that drove a single screw propeller. Steam for the engine was provided by four coal-burning fire-tube boilers, which were vented through a funnel located amidships. The propulsion system was designed to produce 1,800 to 2,000 indicated horsepower (1,300 to 1,500 kW) for a top speed of around 15 knots (28 km/h; 17 mph). In service, the three Sané reached speeds of between 14.47 and 15 knots (26.80 and 27.78 km/h; 16.65 and 17.26 mph). Coal storage amounted to 336 t (331 long tons; 370 short tons), which allowed the ships to steam for up to 6,140 nautical miles (11,370 km; 7,070 mi) at a cruising speed of 10 knots (19 km/h; 12 mph). The ship was fitted with a three-masted barque rig to supplement the steam engine on long voyages abroad.

Sané was completed with three 164.7 mm M1864 guns, each of which was mounted on a rotating platform and fitted with a gun shield. After trials made it apparent that this armament was unsatisfactory, the naval minister Charles de Dompierre d'Hornoy ordered the center and aft gun replaced with six 138.6 mm (5.46 in) M1870 guns of 21.3-calibers length on 16 June 1873. This work was deferred for nearly a year, and in June 1874, the armament was revised slightly by removing one of the 138.6 mm guns. Before work began, however, the Toulon arsenal recommended a uniform battery of six 138.6 mm guns, two on the existing bow and stern platforms and the remainder placed amidships on the broadside, which d'Hornoy approved on 28 July. This became the ship's definitive armament, which she carried for the remainder of her career.

== Service history ==
Ordered on 3 September 1866, the keel for Sané was laid down at the Toulon arsenal just ten days later on 13 September. Her completed hull was launched on 9 April 1870; installation of her propulsion system followed from 7 May 1870 to 11 July 1871. The ship was placed in limited commission for sea trials on 6 November, but her initial crew did not arrive until 29 March 1872. After completing trials on 2 April, Sané was placed in reserve temporarily. The ship was reactivated on 10 November and placed in full commission for service with the Escadre d'évolution (Training Squadron). During this period, she was used as an aviso for the squadron's capital ships; she was also evaluated in comparison with Infernet to evaluate their different armament arrangements. Sané returned to reserve on 30 May 1873 and formally decommissioned on 14 June, to be rearmed after the trials revealed significant problems with her original armament.

Sané was recommissioned on 30 March 1875 and deployed to patrol the Antilles.

In January 1881, the ship was reclassified as an Éclaireur d'escadre (squadron scout). She was reclassified again in January 1885 as a Croiseur de 2^{e} classe (2nd-class cruiser). That year, she underwent a significant refit that included re-boilering. In 1886, the ship was assigned to the Levant station in the eastern Mediterranean. At that time, she patrolled the region in company with the cruiser Rigault de Genouilly, the screw frigate Vénus, and the gunboat Météore. At the Shatt al-Arab in June 1887, Sané embarked a French archeological team that had been working at Susa, Persia. The governor of Dezful attempted to block the removal of the artifacts, but Sané sent a boat of sailors armed with Kropatschek rifles, and their approach convinced the governor to abandon the effort. The ship carried some 215 crates of artifacts to Toulon; from there, they were shipped to Paris to be displayed at the Louvre. Sané was thereafter withdrawn from service.

Left to right: Sané, Talisman, Héron, and Ardent, off the coast of Dahomey in 1892

By 1889, Sané had been reactivated for a tour in the Division Navale de l'Atlantique (Naval Division of the Atlantic), serving along with the cruisers Aréthuse, Roland, and Kerguélen, and the avisos Bisson and Dumont-d'Urville, and the gunboat Étoile. She received another set of new boilers in 1890 at the Rochefort Arsenal. Later that year, the ship had returned to what was now the North Atlantic Squadron, the composition of which remained nearly identical to the previous year, apart from the withdrawal of Dumont-d'Urville. By 1891, the unit had been reduced significantly, to just Sané and the cruiser Talisman. In April 1892, the two cruisers were sent to participate in the Second Franco-Dahomean War as part of an expeditionary force commanded by Colonel Alfred-Amédée Dodds. The naval presence also included the avisos Héron and Ardent. The four vessels established a blockade of the Dahomean coast.

The ship was struck from the naval register on 13 December 1892 and immediately reduced to a hulk. Beginning in 1893, she was used to store coal in Rochefort, with some conversion work taking place between then and 1896. In 1899, she was moved to the Brest Arsenal, still being used as a coal hulk. She received equipment to calibrate torpedoes in 1909, a task performed aboard the ship until 1913. During this period, the ship was renamed Ponton n^{o} 1 in 1910. She was eventually placed for sale at Brest in 1913, but her ultimate disposal is unknown.
