= List of gunboat and gunvessel classes of the Royal Navy =

This is a list of gunboat (Note: The dictionary definition of gunboat at Wiktionary) and gunvessel (Note: The dictionary definition of gunvessel at Wiktionary) classes of the Royal Navy.

For gun-brigs see List of gun-brigs of the Royal Navy.

== Steam gunboats ==
=== Wooden paddle gunboats (Indian service) ===
- Diana (1823)

=== Wooden paddle gunboats (Great Lakes) ===
Name	Builder	Launched	Fate
HMS Toronto	United States	1834	Ex-merchantman General Porter, built in 1834 in the United States and purchased by the Royal Navy on 7 July 1838. Sold in 1843
HMS Experiment	Niagara Dock Company	1838	A paddle-wheeled steamboat, purchased on 21 July 1838. Sold in 1847 or 1848
HMS Traveller	Niagara Dock Company	1838	Ex-merchant ship, purchased at Niagara on 30 April 1839 and sold in 1844
HMS Montreal	Canada	1836	A two-masted schooner (may not have had an engine) purchased for use on Lake Erie on 18 October 1839. Sold 1848
HMS Minos	Chippawa, Ontario	June 1840	Sold to Mr Weston in March 1852
HMS Sydenham	Montreal	1841	Purchased while building at Montreal in 1841. Served in the Mediterranean as a packet. Refitted and reboilered at Woolwich in 1843–44. Sold at Malta on 11 July 1846
HMS Cherokee	Kingston Navy Yard, Ontario	22 September 1842	Sold to Messrs. Campbell, Forsyth, Yarwood & Gaskin on 30 October 1851
Magnet	Hamilton, Canada	1846	The British Government made a part payment while during build, retaining the right to assume possession of the vessel on payment of the remaining portion. The right was relinquished in 1864
HMS Canada	Purchased	Unknown	Purchased in 1847

=== Iron paddle gunboat (Great Lakes) ===
- Mohawk (1843)

Name	Builder	Launched	Fate
HMS Mohawk	William Fairbairn & Company, Millwall	21 February 1843	Delivered in pieces to the Kingston Yard, Lake Ontario. Served on Lake Ontario and later on Lake Huron. Lengthened by 25 ft (7.6 m) in 1846. Sold to J F Park on 21 June 1852

=== Iron paddle despatch vessels/gunboats ===
- Bann class (1855)

Name	Builder	Launched	Fate
HMS Bann	J Scott Russell, Millwall	5 July 1856	Sold for breaking on 18 February 1873
HMS Brune	J Scott Russell, Millwall	30 August 1856	Sold at Lagos on 19 May 1863

=== Wooden screw gunboats ===
- Gleaner (or Pelter) class
  - Pelter (1854)
  - Pincher (1854)
  - Badger (1854)
  - Snapper (1854)
  - Gleaner (1854)
  - Ruby (1854)
- Dapper class
  - Lark (1855)
  - Magpie (1855)
  - Dapper (1855)
  - Fancy (1855)
  - Grinder (1855)
  - Jasper (1855)
  - Hind (1855)
  - Jackdaw (1855)
  - Thistle (1855)
  - Starling (1855)
  - Snap (1855)
  - Redwing (1855)
  - Weazel (1855)
  - Clinker (1855)
  - Cracker (1855)
  - Boxer (1855)
  - Stork (1855)
  - Skylark (1855)
  - Biter (1855)
  - Swinger (1855)
- Albacore class (1855)
  - Beaver (1855)
  - Whiting (1856)
  - Nightingale (1855)
  - Violet (1856)
  - Seagull (1855)
  - Skipjack (1855)
  - Sandfly (1855)
  - Sheldrake (1855)
  - Plover (1855)
  - Tickler (1855)
  - Banterer (1855)
  - Bullfrog (1855)
  - Bustard (1855)
  - Carnation (1855)
  - Charger (1855)
  - Cockchafer (1855)
  - Dove (1855)
  - Forward (1855)
  - Grasshopper (1856)
  - Hasty (1856)
  - Herring (1856)
  - Insolent (1856)
  - Mayflower (1856)
  - Staunch (1856)
  - Goldfinch (1856)
  - Goshawk (1856)
  - Julia (1855)
  - Louisa (1855)
  - Bouncer (1856)
  - Hyena (1856)
  - Savage (1856)
  - Wolf (1856)
  - Griper (1855)
  - Fervent (1856)
  - Forester (1856)
  - Spanker (1856)
  - Traveller (1856)
  - Thrasher (1856)
  - Opossum (1856)
  - Partridge (1856)
  - Charon (1856)
  - Haughty (1856)
  - Leveret (1856)
  - Mackerel (1856)
  - Procris (1856)
  - Shamrock (1856)
  - Spey (1856)
  - Tilbury (1856)
  - Peacock (1856)
  - Pheasant (1856)
  - Primrose (1856)
  - Pickle (1856)
  - Prompt (1856)
  - Porpoise (1856)
  - Firm (1856)
  - Flamer (1856)
  - Fly (1856)
  - Sepoy (1856)
  - Erne (1856)
  - Spider (1856)
  - Lively (1856)
  - Surly (1856)
  - Swan (1856)
  - Delight (1856)
  - Grappler (1856)
  - Growler (1856)
  - Parthian (1856)
  - Quail (1856)
  - Ripple (1856)
  - Cochin (1856)
  - Cherokee (1856)
  - Camel (1856)
  - Caroline (1856)
  - Confounder (1856)
  - Crocus (1856)
  - Beacon (1856)
  - Brave (1856)
  - Bullfinch (1856)
  - Redbreast (1856)
  - Rose (1856)
  - Blazer (1856)
  - Rainbow (1856)
  - Brazen (1856)
  - Raven (1856)
  - Rocket (1856)
  - Hardy (1856)
  - Havock (1856)
  - Highlander (1856)
  - Albacore (1856)
  - Amelia (1856)
  - Foam (1856)
  - Wave (1856)
  - Magnet (1856)
  - Manly (1856)
  - Mastiff (1856)
  - Mistletoe (1856)
  - Earnest (1856)
  - Escort (1856)
- Cheerful class
  - Cheerful (1856)
  - Chub (1856)
  - Daisy (1856)
  - Dwarf (1856)
  - Blossom (1856)
  - Gadfly (1856)
  - Gnat (1856)
  - Garland (1856)
  - Fidget (1856)
  - Flirt (1856)
  - Onyx (1856)
  - Pert (1856)
  - Midge (1856)
  - Tiny (1856)
  - Angler (1856)
  - Ant (1856)
  - Nettle (1856)
  - Pet (1856)
  - Decoy (1856)
  - Rambler (1856)
- Clown class
  - Fenella (1856)
  - Garnet (1856)
  - Handy (1856)
  - Hunter (1856)
  - Drake (1856)
  - Janus (1856)
  - Clown (1856)
  - Kestrel (1856)
  - Ready (1856)
  - Thrush (1856)
  - Watchful (1856)
  - Woodcock (1856)
- Algerine class
  - Jaseur (1857)
  - Jasper (1857)
  - Algerine (1857)
  - Lee (1857)
  - Leven (1857)
  - Slaney (1857)
- Britomart class
  - Britomart (1860)
  - Cockatrice (1860)
  - Wizard (1860)
  - Speedy (1860)
  - Doterel (1860)
  - Heron (1860)
  - Pigeon (1860)
  - Linnet (1860)
  - Tyrian (1861)
  - Trinculo (1860)
  - Cherub (1865)
  - Netley (1866)
  - Minstrel (1865)
  - Orwell (1866)
  - Cromer (1867)
  - Bruiser (1867) (or Bruizer)
  - Bramble (cancelled)
  - Crown (cancelled)
  - Protector (cancelled)
  - Danube (cancelled)

=== Composite screw gunboats ===
The gunboats designed from 1870 onwards were of composite construction, i.e. they had an iron keel, stem and stern posts, and iron framing, with wooden planking retained over the iron frames.

- Ariel class
  - Coquette (1871)
  - Foam (1871)
  - Decoy (1871)
  - Merlin (1871)
  - Mosquito (1871)
  - Goshawk (1872)
  - Swinger (1872)
  - Ariel (1873)
  - Zephyr (1873)
- Forester class
  - Cygnet (1874)
  - Express (1874)
  - Contest (1874)
  - Sheldrake (1875)
  - Mallard (1875)
  - Moorhen (1875)
  - Foxhound (1877)
  - Forward (1877)
  - Firm (1877)
  - Forester (1877)
  - Firebrand (1877)
  - Firefly (1877)
- Banterer class
  - Redwing (1880)
  - Grappler (1880)
  - Wrangler (1880)
  - Wasp (1880)
  - Banterer (1880)
  - Espoir (1880)
  - Bullfrog (1880)
  - Cockchafer (1881)
  - Starling (1882)
  - Stork (1882)
  - Raven (1882)
- Albacore class
  - HMS Albacore
  - HMS Mistletoe
  - HMS Watchful
- Bramble class
  - Rattler (1886)
  - Wasp (1886)
  - Lizard (1886)
  - Bramble (1886)
- Pygmy class

Name	Builder	Launched	Fate
HMS Pheasant	Devonport Dockyard	10 April 1888	Sold to Cox for breaking at Falmouth on 15 May 1906
HMS Partridge	Devonport Dockyard	10 May 1888	Sold in 1909 at Simonstown to Ward of Preston; arrived Preston for breaking on 6 May 1913
HMS Peacock	Pembroke Dockyard	22 June 1888	Sold to Ellis, Chepstow for breaking on 15 May 1906
HMS Pigmy	Sheerness Dockyard	27 July 1888	Sold to Cox for breaking at Falmouth on 4 April 1905
HMS Pigeon	Pembroke Dockyard	5 September 1888	Sold to V Grech for commercial use on 15 May 1906
HMS Plover	Pembroke Dockyard	18 October 1888	Boom defence vessel in 1904. Sold at Gibraltar on 27 April 1927

- Redbreast class
  - Magpie (1889)
  - Redbreast (1889)
  - Redpole (1889)
  - Ringdove (1889)
  - Lapwing (1889)
  - Goldfinch (1889)
  - Thrush (1889)
  - Widgeon (1889)
  - Sparrow (1889)

=== Armoured gunboats ===
The only ironclads of gunboat size were three largely experimental (and unsuccessful) vessels ordered in 1864. The first two were towed to the Royal Naval Dockyard at the Imperial fortress colony of Bermuda (being considered unsatisfactory to sail under their own power) where they served as harbour vessels and for coastal defence (Vixen ultimately being sunk to block a channel that torpedo boats might have used to attack ships of the North America and West Indies Station at their anchorage on Grassy Bay). Vixen was the first twin-screw vessel built for the Royal Navy, and Waterwitch employed a form of water pump propulsion.

- Vixen (1865)
- Viper (1865)
- Waterwitch (1866)

=== Iron coastal gunboats ===
- Staunch class (1867)

Name	Builder	Launched	Fate
HMS Staunch	Charles Mitchell & Co, Walker	17 June 1867	Sold for use as a fuel barge in 1904

- Plucky class (1870)

Name	Builder	Launched	Fate
HMS Plucky	Portsmouth Dockyard	13 July 1870	Renamed Banterer in June 1915, sold for commercial use in 1928 and finally broken up at Inverkeithing in 1969

- Ant class – Gadfly, Pincher, Griper and Tickler are sometimes referred to as the Gadfly class.
  - Blazer (1870)
  - Comet (1870)
  - Bustard (1871)
  - Kite (1871)
  - Scourge (1871)
  - Snake (1871)
  - Mastiff (1871)
  - Bloodhound (1871)
  - Arrow (1871)
  - Bonetta (1871)
  - Badger (1872)
  - Fidget (1872)
  - Bulldog (1872)
  - Pike (1872)
  - Pickle (1872)
  - Snap (1872)
  - Ant (1873)
  - Cuckoo (1873)
  - Hyaena (1873)
  - Weazel (1873)
  - Gadfly (1879)
  - Pincher (1879)
  - Griper (1879)
  - Tickler (1879)
- Medina class (or River class) (1876)
  - Medina (1876)
  - Medway (1876)
  - Sabrina (1876)
  - Spey (1876)
  - Tay (1876)
  - Tees (1876)
  - Dee (1877)
  - Don (1877)
  - Esk (1877)
  - Slaney (1877)
  - Trent (1877)
  - Tweed (1877)

=== Steel coastal gunboats ===
- Bouncer class (1881)

Name	Builder	Launched	Fate
HMS Bouncer	Pembroke Dockyard	15 March 1881	Ordered to be converted to a tank vessel in October 1904, but instead sold at Sheerness on 4 April 1905
HMS Insolent	Pembroke Dockyard	15 March 1881	Gate vessel in January 1918. Foundered in Portsmouth Harbour on 1 July 1922; the wreck was sold to J H Pounds, Portsmouth, on 18 June 1925

- Handy class (1882)

Name	Builder	Launched	Fate
HMS Handy	Charles Mitchell and Company, Walker	30 December 1882	Renamed Excellent in May 1891 as a training ship, then Calcutta on 1 November 1916, and finally Snapper in August 1917. Sold on 27 April 1924. She was sold again to Pounds shipbreakers in the 1970s but not broken up. She was finally scrapped in 2008.

- Drudge class (1882)

Name	Builder	Launched	Fate
HMS Drudge	Armstrong Whitworth	15 June 1887	Built for the Ordnance Department and transferred to the Royal Navy in 1901. Renamed Excellent on 21 November 1916 and Dryad on 26 January 1919. Renamed back to Drudge later in 1919 and sold on 27 March 1920

=== Torpedo ram ===
- Polyphemus class
  - Polyphemus (1881)
  - Hull 2 (cancelled 10 November 1882 before being named)
  - Adventure (cancelled 12 August 1885)

=== Torpedo gunboats ===
- Rattlesnake (1886)
- Grasshopper class (1887)
  - Sandfly (1887)
  - Grasshopper (1887)
  - Spider (1887)
- Sharpshooter class
  - Sharpshooter (1888)
  - Spanker (1889)
  - Speedwell (1889)
  - Seagull (1889)
  - Salamander (1889)
  - Sheldrake (1889)
  - Skipjack (1889)
  - Boomerang (1889)
  - Karakatta (1889)
  - Plassey (1890)
  - Assaye (1890)
  - Gossamer (1890)
  - Gleaner (1890)
- Alarm class
  - Jason (1892)
  - Circe (1892)
  - Hebe (1892)
  - Onyx (1892)
  - Leda (1892)
  - Alarm (1892)
  - Jaseur (1892)
  - Renard (1892)
  - Niger (1892)
  - Speedy (1893)
  - Antelope (1893)
- Dryad class
  - Hazard (1894)
  - Halcyon (1894)
  - Harrier (1894)
  - Hussar (1894)
  - Dryad (1893)

=== Steel gunboats ===
- Bramble class (1898)

Name	Builder	Launched	Fate
HMS Dwarf	London & Glasgow, Govan	15 November 1898	Sold to Ward, Pembroke on 13 July 1926
HMS Bramble	Potter, Liverpool	26 November 1898	Sold at Bombay on 26 January 1920
HMS Britomart	Potter, Liverpool	28 March 1899	Sold at Bombay on 10 June 1920 and renamed Sakuntala
HMS Thistle	London & Glasgow, Govan	22 June 1899	Sold to Ward, Pembroke on 13 July 1926

=== River gunboats ===
Insect class (1915) The Insect-class gunboats were a class of small, but well-armed Royal Navy ships designed for use in shallow rivers or inshore. Several of them took also part in World War II.

  - Aphis: built by Ailsa shipbuilding, scrapped Singapore, 1947
  - Bee: built by Ailsa shipbuilding, flagship of Rear Admiral, Yangtze (RAY), sold in March 1939.
  - Cicala: built by Barclay Curle, sunk by Japanese bombs on 21 December 1941.
  - Cockchafer: built by Barclay Curle, sold for scrap in 1949, the last surviving member of the class.
  - Cricket: built by Barclay Curle, heavily damaged by bombs on 29 June 1941; used as target by Royal Navy and sunk off Cyprus 1944.
  - Glowworm: built by Barclay Curle, scrapped September 1928.
  - Gnat: built by Lobnitz, damaged by U-boat 21 October 1941, declared total loss, and then used as anti-aircraft platform. Scrapped 1946
  - Ladybird: built by Lobnitz, sunk on 12 May 1941 off Tobruk during World War II, then used as an anti-aircraft position
  - Mantis: built by William Doxford & Sons, sold in January 1940 and subsequently scrapped.
  - Moth: built by William Doxford & Sons, scuttled in Hong Kong 1941, captured and repaired by the Japanese and renamed Suma, sunk by mines in Yangtze River on 19 March 1945.
  - Scarab: built by Wood, Skinner & Co, scrapped in 1948.
  - Tarantula built by Wood, Skinner & Co, briefly flagship of the British Pacific Fleet, expended as a target 1946

== Steam gunvessels ==
=== Wooden paddle gunvessels ===
- Pluto class (1831) – steam vessel rated from 1837 as a first-class steam gunvessel

Name	Builder	Launched	Fate
HMS Pluto	Woolwich Dockyard	28 April 1831	Breaking completed at Sheerness on 26 March 1861

- Firebrand class (1831) – steam vessels reclassified in 1844 as first-class steam gunvessels

Name	Builder	Launched	Fate
HMS Firebrand	Curling, Young & Company, Limehouse	11 July 1831	Re-engined in 1833 and renamed Black Eagle on 5 February 1842, lengthened in 1843 and re-rated as a paddle yacht, completing service as Admiralty yacht until 1857. Broken up at Portsmouth in March 1876
HMS Flamer	Fletcher & Fearnall, Limehouse	11 August 1831	Refitted for the Holyhead Station in 1848–49. Lost on the coast of West Africa off Monrovia on 22 November 1850

- Firefly class (1832) – steam vessels reclassified in 1844 as first-class steam gunvessels

Name	Builder	Launched	Fate
HMS Firefly	Woolwich Dockyard	29 September 1832	Re-engined in 1844 and became a survey ship. Broken up at Malta in 1866
HMS Spitfire	Woolwich Dockyard	26 March 1834	Wrecked whilst working as a troop ship on Half Moon Cay lighthouse reef, Belize in 1842

- Tartarus class (1834) – steam vessels reclassified in 1844 as first-class steam gunvessels

Name	Builder	Launched	Fate
HMS Tartarus	Pembroke Dockyard	23 June 1834	Re-engined in 1837–38. Breaking completed at Malta on 6 November 1860
HMS Blazer	Chatham Dockyard	5.1834	Became a survey ship in January 1843. Breaking up completed at Portsmouth in August 1853

- Lizard class (1840) – steam vessels reclassified in 1844 as second class steam gunvessels

Name	Builder	Launched	Fate
HMS Lizard	Woolwich Dockyard	7 January 1840	Initially fitted for surveying. Lost in collision with the French armed steamer Veloce between Gibraltar and Cadiz on 26 July 1843
HMS Locust	Woolwich Dockyard	18 April 1840	Became a tug in 1869. Sold at Sheerness in 1895

- Porcupine class (1844) – steam vessel reclassified in 1844 as a first-class steam gunvessel

Name	Builder	Launched	Fate
HMS Porcupine	Deptford Dockyard	17 June 1844	Became a survey ship in 1862. Sold in 1883

- Spitfire class (1845) – steam vessel reclassified in 1844 as a first-class steam gunvessel

Name	Builder	Launched	Fate
HMS Spitfire	Deptford Dockyard	26 March 1845	Became a survey ship in 1851 and a tug in 1861. Broken up at Bermuda in 1888

=== Iron paddle gunvessels ===
- Jackal class
  - Jackall (1844)
  - Lizard (1844)
- Torch class (1845)

Name	Builder	Launched	Fate
Torch	Ditchburn & Mare, Leamouth	25 February 1845	Sold at Sydney on 15 May 1856
Harpy	Ditchburn & Mare, Leamouth	4 March 1845	Transferred to the War Office as a target on 26 October 1892 and sold as a wreck in 1909

- Bloodhound class
  - Bloodhound (1845)
- Myrmidon class (1845)

Name	Builder	Launched	Fate
Myrmidon	Ditchburn & Mare, Leamouth	February 1845	Sold at Fernando Po on 1 December 1858

- Grappler class (1845)

Name	Builder	Launched	Fate
Grappler	William Fairbairn & Company, Millwall	30 December 1845	Sold to W P Beach for breaking on 2 February 1850

- Recruit class (1850)

Name	Builder	Launched	Fate
Recruit	J Scott Russell & Robinson, Millwall	1850	Ex-Prussian Salamander, commissioned into the Royal Navy on 22 December 1854. Sold to E Bates on 23 September 1869
Weser	J Scott Russell & Robinson, Millwall	1850	Ex-Prussian Nix, commissioned into the Royal Navy on 22 December 1854. Harbour service in 1866. Sold at Malta on 29 October 1873

NB. A third vessel of the class was retained by Prussia.

=== Wooden screw gunvessels ===
This section includes two early iron-hulled screw gunvessels ordered in May 1845, which in other respects were half-sisters to two wooden-hulled gunvessels ordered at the same time. The four vessels comprised the first-class gunvessels Rifleman (wooden hulled) and Sharpshooter (iron hulled), and the second-class gunvessels Teazer (wooden hulled) and Minx (iron hulled). Further vessels ordered later to the same design were either cancelled or built to very different concepts. Rifleman and Sharpshooter were re-classed as sloops in 1854.

- Rifleman class (wooden half-sisters to iron-hulled Sharpshooter)
  - Rifleman (1845)
  - Sepoy (cancelled 1849)
  - Cossack (cancelled 1849)
- Sharpshooter class (iron half-sister to wooden Rifleman)
  - HMS Sharpshooter
- Teazer class (wooden-hulled half-sisters to iron-hulled Minx)
  - Teazer (1846)
  - Boxer (cancelled 1849)
  - Biter (cancelled 1849)
- Minx class (iron half-sister to wooden Teazer)
  - Minx (1846)
- Swallow class – 4 first-class gunvessels were ordered in 1852–1853; while still building, they were re-rated as third-class sloops in 1854 and will be found under the list of corvette and sloop classes of the Royal Navy.
- Arrow class – originally rated as "despatch vessels", these six ships were re-classed as second-class gunvessels in 1856.
  - Arrow (1854)
  - Beagle (1854)
  - Lynx (1854)
  - Snake (1854)
  - Viper (1854)
  - Wrangler (1854)
- Vigilant class
  - Coquette (1855)
  - Wanderer (1855)
  - Alacrity (1855)
  - Vigilant (1856)
  - Lapwing (1856)
  - Ringdove (1856)
  - Surprise (1856)
  - Renard (1856)
  - Foxhound (1856)
  - Mohawk (1856)
  - Sparrowhawk (1856)
  - Osprey (1856)
  - Cormorant (1856)
  - Assurance (1856)
- Intrepid class
  - Flying Fish (1855)
  - Pioneer (1856)
  - Victor (1855)
  - Intrepid (1855)
  - Roebuck (1856)
  - Nimrod (1856)
- Philomel (or Ranger) class
  - Ranger (1859)
  - Espoir (1860)
  - Landrail (1860)
  - Nimble (1860)
  - Speedwell (1861)
  - Pandora (1861)
  - Lee (1860)
  - Dart (1860)
  - Snipe (1860)
  - Sparrow (1860)
  - Torch (1859)
  - Plover (1860)
  - Penguin (1860)
  - Steady (1860)
  - Cygnet (1860)
  - Griffon (1860)
  - Mullett (1860)
  - Philomel (1860)
  - Newport (1867)
  - Alban (cancelled)
  - Jaseur (1862)
  - Humber (cancelled)
  - Undine (cancelled)
  - Rye (cancelled)
  - Portia (cancelled)
  - Discovery (cancelled)
- Cormorant (or Eclipse) class (1860)
  - Cormorant (1860)
  - Racehorse (1860)
  - Serpent (1860)
  - Star (1860)
  - Eclipse (1860)
  - Lily (1861)
  - Sylvia (1866)
  - Nassau (1866)
  - Myrmidon (1867)
  - Tartarus (cancelled 1864)
  - Pegasus (cancelled 1863)
  - Albatross (cancelled 1863)
  - Guernsey (cancelled 1863)
- Plover class (1867)
  - Plover (1867)
  - Ringdove (1867)
  - Philomel (1867)
  - Lapwing (1867)
  - Magpie (1868)
  - Bullfinch (1868)
  - Seagull (1868)
  - Curlew (1868)
  - Swallow (1868)
  - Bittern (1869)
  - Vulture (1869)
  - Woodlark (1871)

=== Composite screw gunvessels ===
The gunvessels designed from 1867 onwards were of composite construction, i.e. they had an iron keel, stem and stern posts, and iron framing, with wooden planking retained over the iron frames.

- Beacon class (1867)
  - Beacon (1867)
  - Avon (1867)
  - Gnat (1867)
  - Cracker (1867)
  - Dwarf (1867)
  - Flirt (1867)
  - Fly (1867)
  - Elk (1868)
  - Boxer (1868)
  - Thistle (1868)
  - Hornet (1868)
  - Rocket (1868)
  - Lynx (1868)
  - Teazer (1868)
  - Midge (1868)
  - Pert (1868)
  - Hart (1868)
  - Growler (1868)
- Frolic class (1872)
  - Frolic (1872)
  - Kestrel (1872)
  - Ready (1872)
  - Rifleman (1872)
- Arab class (1874)
  - Arab (1874)
  - Lily (1874)
- Condor class
  - Flamingo (1876)
  - Griffon (1876)
  - Condor (1876)
  - Falcon (1877)
- Linnet class (1879)

Name	Builder	Launched	Fate
HMS Swift	Thames Ironworks & Shipbuilding Company, Leamouth, London	29 November 1879	Sold at Hong Kong in 1920 for mercantile use, renamed Hoi Ching
HMS Linnet	Thames Ironworks & Shipbuilding Company, Leamouth, London	30 January 1880	Sold as a salvage vessel on 27 April 1904

- Algerine class
  - Rambler (1880)
  - Ranger (1880)
  - Algerine (1880)
- Dolphin class (1882)

Name	Builder	Launched	Fate
HMS Dolphin	William Raylton Dixon, Middlesbrough	9 December 1882	Sailing training ship in 1899. Hulked as accommodation for submarines in 1907. Submarine depot ship in 1912. Sold on 13 March 1925, but foundered under tow on 19 April 1925, then raised and beached; and used as an accommodation school ship until broken up in 1977 at Bo'ness
HMS Wanderer	William Raylton Dixon, Middlesbrough	8 February 1883	Sailing training ship (brig-rigged) in 1894. Sold to Ward, Preston for breaking in February 1907

- Mariner class

Like the preceding Arab to Dolphin classes, these were designed by Nathaniel Barnaby; they were re-classed as screw sloops on 26 November 1884.

Name	Builder	Launched	Fate
HMS Mariner	Devonport Dockyard	23 June 1884	Boom defence 1903; salvage vessel 1917, laid up 1922, then sold to Hughes Bolckow, Blyth on 19 February 1929 for breaking up.
HMS Reindeer	Devonport Dockyard	14 November 1883	Boom defence 1904; salvage vessel 1917, renamed Reindeer I. Sold as salvage ship 12 July 1924; abandoned at sea March 1932.
HMS Racer	Devonport Dockyard	6 August 1884	Tender to Britannia at Dartmouth 1896; to Portsmouth February 1903. Salvage vessel June 1917. Sold to Hughes Bolckow, Blyth on 6 November 1928 for breaking up.
HMS Icarus	Devonport Dockyard	27 July 1885	Sold 12 April 1904.
HMS Acorn	Milford Haven Shipbuilding Company	6 September 1884	Sold 15 December 1899 for breaking, which took place at Milford Haven in 1904.
HMS Melita	Malta Dockyard	20 March 1888	Boom defence May 1905; salvage vessel December 1915, renamed Ringdove; sold to Falmouth Docks Board on 9 July 1920.

=== Steel torpedo-and-gunvessels ===
- Curlew class (1885)

Name	Builder	Launched	Fate
HMS Curlew	Devonport Dockyard	23 October 1885	Sold for breaking on 10 July 1906
HMS Landrail	Devonport Dockyard	19 January 1886	Sunk as target in Lyme Bay on 4 October 1906

== See also ==
- Arctic Whale-class whaler
