= HMS Alarm (1892) =

British torpedo gunboat and minesweeper

History

United Kingdom
- Name: HMS Alarm
- Builder: Sheerness Dockyard
- Laid down: 25 June 1891
- Launched: 13 September 1892
- Completed: March 1894
- Fate: Scrapped 1907

General characteristics
- Class & type: Alarm-class torpedo gunboat
- Displacement: 810 long tons (820 t)
- Length: 230 ft 0 in (70.10 m) pp
- Beam: 27 ft 0 in (8.23 m)
- Draught: 8 ft 6 in (2.59 m)
- Installed power: 3,500 ihp (2,600 kW)
- Propulsion: 2× triple expansion steam engines; 2 shafts
- Speed: 18.7 kn (21.5 mph; 34.6 km/h)
- Complement: 91
- Armament: 2 × 4.7 in (120 mm) QF guns; 4 × 3-pounder (47 mm ) guns; 1 × Gardiner machine gun; 5 × 14 inch torpedo tubes

HMS Alarm was a torpedo gunboat of the British Royal Navy and the name ship of her class. Alarm was built by Sheerness Dockyard from 1891–1894. She was sold for scrap in 1907.

== Design and construction ==
Alarm was one of 11 Alarm-class torpedo gunboats ordered for the Royal Navy under the 1889 Naval Defence Act, which authorised the shipbuilding programme for the next five years, and also included the last two torpedo-gunboats of the Sharpshooter-class and the five torpedo-gunboats of the Dryad-class. The Alarms were slightly modified versions of the previous Sharpshooter-class, with modified engines to improve reliability.

Alarm was 230 feet (70.10 m) long between perpendiculars, with a beam of 27 feet (8.23 m) and a draught of 12 feet (3.66 m). Displacement was 810 long tons (820 t). Two triple-expansion steam engines, fed by four locomotive boilers, drove two propeller shafts. The machinery was heavier than that installed in the Sharpshooters, and was slightly downrated (from 3,600 indicated horsepower (2,700 kW) to 3,500 indicated horsepower (2,600 kW)) to improve reliability. This gave a speed of 18.5 knots (21.3 mph; 34.3 km/h).

The ship was armed with two 4.7 inch (120 mm) QF guns mounted fore and aft on the ship's centreline, backed up by four 3-pounder (47 mm) guns (two in single mounts on the ship's beam and two in casemates forward) and a single Gardner machine gun. Five 14-inch torpedo tubes were fitted (one fixed in the ship's bow and two twin mounts), with three reload torpedoes carried. The ship had a crew of 91.

Alarm was laid down at Sheerness Dockyard on 25 June 1891 and launched on 13 September 1892. Alarm reached a speed of 19.2 kn (22.1 mph; 35.6 km/h) during sea trials. She was completed in March 1894 at a cost of £59,346.

== Service ==
Alarm was commissioned into the Medway Fleet Reserve, based at Chatham on 30 March 1894. In August 1894 Alarm took part in that year's Naval Manoeuvres. In July–August 1895, Alarm again took part in the annual Naval Manoeuvres, supporting the Channel Fleet and returning to reserve on completion of the exercises. She took part in the 1896 Manoeuvres in July–August that year, operating out of Dublin Bay. On 26 June 1897 Alarm took part in the Fleet Review at Spithead celebrating the Diamond Jubilee of Queen Victoria, and after the review, decommissioned at Devonport, to recommission with the crew of the torpedo gunboat Sheldrake, replacing Sheldrake as tender to Galatea, coastguard ship at Hull, and carrying out fishery protection duties in the North Sea.

On 22 February 1898, Alarm visited Wells-next-the-Sea to deliver stores to the coastguard station. Alarm signalled her presence by the ship's whistle, and the coastguards despatched a boat to pick up the stores, despite a heavy sea inshore due to high winds from the North. When this did not arrive, Alarm, whose Master was not aware of the treacherous conditions close to shore, launched a gig to deliver the stores, but later that day, search parties from the coastguard station found both boats capsized. All five men aboard the coastguard boat and six men aboard Alarm's boat were killed. On 15 June 1899, Alarm dispersed a number of French fishing boats from Boulogne which were operating in Folkestone Bay, within British waters, with one of the French boats later seized and her master fined, with the boat's catch and fishing gear confiscated.

Alarm took part in the 1900 Naval Manoeuvres in July that year, and was judged by the umpires to have been captured, along with sister ship Leda by the opposing force. Torpedo gunboats including Alarm were criticised in reports of the manoeuvres for not making their nominal speeds, and being unsuitable for use against torpedo boats or destroyers.

Alarm had been stricken from the effective list by 1905, being described in Parliament as being "of comparatively small fighting value", although her armament was not removed. Torpedo gunboats that had been re-boilered and re-engined were considered still effective and retained in service, but it was not felt worthwhile to re-engine the remaining torpedo gunboats, such as Alarm. Alarm was sold for scrap to the Thames Shipbuilding Company on 9 April 1907.

== Bibliography ==
- Brassey, T. A., ed. (1894). The Naval Annual 1894. Portsmouth, UK: J Griffin and Co.
- Brassey, T. A., ed. (1895). The Naval Annual 1895. Portsmouth, UK: J Griffin and Co.
- Brassey, T. A., ed. (1896). The Naval Annual 1896. Portsmouth, UK: J Griffin and Co.
- Brassey, T. A., ed. (1897). The Naval Annual 1897. Portsmouth, UK: J Griffin and Co.
- Brassey, T. A., ed. (1898). The Naval Annual 1898. Portsmouth, UK: J Griffin and Co.
- Brassey, T. A., ed. (1905). The Naval Annual 1905. Portsmouth, UK: J Griffin and Co.
- Brown, Les (2023). Royal Navy Torpedo Vessels. Barnsley, UK: Seaforth Publishing. ISBN 978-1-3990-2285-9.
- Chesneau, Roger; Kolesnik, Eugene M., eds. (1979). Conway's All the World's Fighting Ships 1860–1905. London: Conway Maritime Press. ISBN 0-85177-133-5.
- Friedman, Norman (2009). British Destroyers: From Earliest Days to the Second World War. Barnsley, UK: Seaforth Publishing. ISBN 978-1-84832-049-9.
- Leyland, John, ed. (1901). The Naval Annual 1901. Portsmouth, UK: J Griffin and Co.
- Lyon, David; Winfield, Rif (2004). The Sail & Steam Navy List: All the Ships of the Royal Navy 1815–1889. London: Chatham Publishing. ISBN 1-86176-032-9.
