= HMS Danube =

One ship of the Royal Navy and one planned one have borne the name HMS Danube, after the Danube, a river in central and eastern Europe:

- HMS Danube (1854) was a wooden paddle vessel purchased in 1854 and sold in 1856.
- HMS Danube was to have been a Britomart-class gunboat. She was ordered in 1861 and cancelled in 1863.
