= Charles de Bartolomé =

Admiral Sir Charles de Bartolomé KCMG CB
- Captain Charles de Bartolomé, 1918
- Born: 26 November 1871
- Died: 27 May 1941 (aged 69)
- Military career
- Allegiance: United Kingdom
- Branch: Royal Navy
- Service years: 1885–1919
- Rank: Admiral
- Commands: Third Sea Lord (1918–19); HMS Warspite (1916–18); HMS Invincible (1914); HMS Neptune (1911); HMS Indomitable (1909–11); HMS Dreadnought (1908–09)
- Conflicts: First World War
- Awards: Knight Commander of the Order of St Michael and St George; Companion of the Order of the Bath

Admiral Sir Charles Martin de Bartolomé, KCMG, CB (26 November 1871 – 27 May 1941) was a Royal Navy officer who served as Third Sea Lord and Controller of the Navy from 1918 to 1919.

== Naval career ==
Born the son of a Castilian physician, De Bartolomé joined the Royal Navy in 1885. He was posted as a lieutenant on the staff of HMS Excellent, shore establishment at Portsmouth, on 1 February 1900. He was promoted to commander on 31 December 1902, and posted to the armoured cruiser HMS Drake on her first commission in January 1903, serving in the Channel Fleet. Promoted to captain in 1905, he was given command of HMS Dreadnought. He served in the First World War and was appointed Naval Assistant to the First Sea Lord in 1912 and Naval Secretary in 1914. He became Third Sea Lord and Controller of the Navy in 1918 in which year he also became Aide-de-Camp to the King; he retired in 1919 and then became Director General of Development at the Ministry of Transport.

== Family ==
In 1918 de Bartolomé married Gladys Constance Wilson. Their second son, Stephen Martin de Bartolomé, married Helen Elisabeth Dawn, daughter of Brigadier General Alfred Ernest Irvine, of Under-the-Hill House, Wotton-under-Edge, Gloucestershire.

Military offices
| Preceded by Henry Oliver | Naval Secretary; 1914–1916 | Succeeded by Allan Everett |
| Preceded by Sir Lionel Halsey | Third Sea Lord; 1918–1919 | Succeeded by Sir William Nicholson |
| Preceded by Sir Alan Anderson | Controller of the Navy; 1918–1919 | Succeeded by Sir William Nicholson |
