= HMS Bramble =

Seven ships of the Royal Navy have borne the name HMS Bramble. An eighth was planned but never completed:

- HMS Bramble (1656) was a 14-gun ship, formerly an Ostend privateer. She was captured in 1656, converted to a fireship in 1665 and expended against the Dutch in 1667.
- HMS Bramble (1809) was a 10-gun schooner launched in Bermuda. She had a relatively brief and uneventful career before the Royal Navy sold her in December 1815. She became the mercantile Bramble (or Bamble), and was last listed in 1824.
- HMS Bramble (1822) was a 10-gun cutter launched in 1822. She was converted to a survey vessel in 1842, lent to the Colonial Department in 1853 as a diving-bell vessel, and sold in 1876.
- HMS Bramble was to have been a Britomart-class wooden screw gunboat laid down in 1861 and cancelled in 1863.
- HMS Bramble (1886) was a Bramble-class gunboat launched in 1886 at Harland & Wolff. The book ‘The Cruise of the "Alerte"’ by E. F. Knight describes how she visited Trindade and Martin Vaz in 1889. She was renamed HMS Cockatrice in 1896 and was sold in 1906.
- HMS Bramble (1898) was a later Bramble-class gunboat launched in 1898 and sold in 1920.
- HMS Bramble (J11) was an Halcyon-class minesweeper launched in 1938 and sunk by German ships in 1942 in the Battle of the Barents Sea.
- HMS Bramble (J273) was an Algerine-class minesweeper launched in 1945 and scrapped in 1961.
