= William Nicholson (Royal Navy officer) =

Royal Navy Admiral (1863–1932)

Admiral Sir William Nicholson KCB
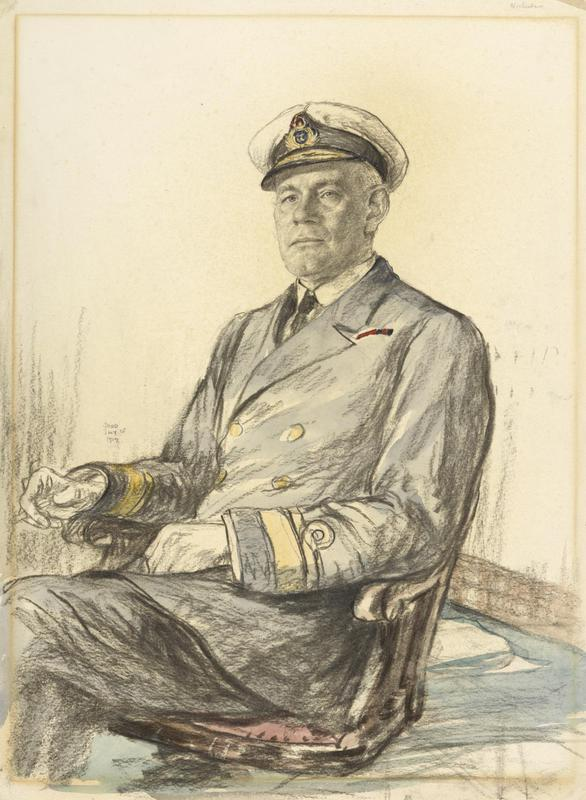
- Rear-admiral William Coldingham Masters Nicholson by Francis Dodd
- Born: 28 October 1863
- Died: 9 January 1932 (aged 68)
- Military career
- Allegiance: United Kingdom
- Branch: Royal Navy
- Rank: Admiral
- Commands: HMS Canada
- Conflicts: World War I
- Awards: Knight Commander of the Order of the Bath

Admiral Sir William Coldingham Masters Nicholson, KCB (28 October 1863 – 9 January 1932) was a Royal Navy officer who went on to be Third Sea Lord and Controller of the Navy.

== Naval career ==
Nicholson was educated at Stubbington House School. Nicholson was promoted to the rank of Lieutenant on 21 August 1885. A Commander in the Royal Navy, he was on 10 September 1902 appointed in command of the torpedo gunboat HMS Antelope, serving in home waters.

He served in World War I and, as Captain of HMS Canada, saw action at the Battle of Jutland in 1916. He went on to be Rear Admiral i.e. Second of Command of the 1st Battle Squadron later that year. He was appointed Third Sea Lord and Controller of the Navy in 1919 and was given command of the 2nd Battle Squadron in October 1920. He then became Commander of the 1st Battle Squadron in May 1921.

He lived at Winchcombe in Gloucestershire.

Military offices
Preceded by Sir Charles de Bartolomé	Third Sea Lord and Controller of the Navy; 1919–1920	Succeeded by Sir Frederick Field
