= HMS Crown =

Five ships of the Royal Navy have borne the name HMS Crown. Another was planned but never completed:

- HMS Crown (1660) was a 48-gun ship launched as Taunton in 1654. She was renamed HMS Crown on the restoration in 1660, was rebuilt in 1704 and wrecked in 1719.
- HMS Crown (1747) was a 44-gun fifth rate launched in 1747, used as a storeship from 1757, and sold in 1770.
- HMS Crown (1782) was a 64-gun third rate launched in 1782. She was used as a prison ship from 1798, a powder hulk from 1802 and was broken up in 1816.
- HMS Crown (1794) was a gunvessel purchased in 1794 and sold in 1800.
- HMS Crown was to have been a Britomart-class wooden screw gunboat. She was laid down in 1861 and cancelled in 1863.
- HMS Crown (R46) was a C-class destroyer launched in 1945 and sold to the Royal Norwegian Navy in 1946 as Oslo.

== See also ==
- HMS Crown Malago
- HMS Crown Prize
