= HMS Antelope (1893) =

Royal Navy Alarm-class torpedo gunboat

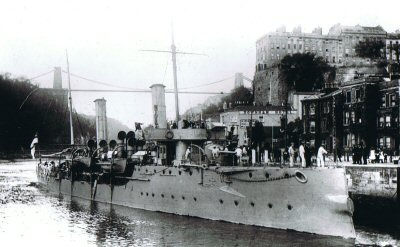
- HMS Antelope in the River Avon, Bristol, circa 1908.

History

United Kingdom
- Name: HMS Antelope
- Builder: Devonport Dockyard
- Laid down: 21 October 1889
- Launched: 12 July 1893
- Commissioned: 18 July 1894
- Fate: Sold for breaking on 27 May 1919

General characteristics
- Class & type: Alarm-class torpedo gunboat
- Displacement: 810 tons
- Length: 242 ft (74 m)
- Beam: 27 ft (8.2 m)
- Draught: 12 ft 6 in (3.81 m) maximum
- Installed power: 3,500 ihp (2,600 kW)
- Propulsion: 2 × 3-cylinder vertical triple-expansion steam engines; Locomotive boilers; Twin screws
- Speed: 18.7 kn (34.6 km/h)
- Complement: 91
- Armament: 1 × bow 18-inch torpedo tube; 2 × revolving 18-inch torpedo tubes; 2 × QF 4.7-inch (12 cm) guns; 4 × 3-pounder guns; 1 × Gardner machine gun

HMS Antelope was an Alarm-class torpedo gunboat of the Royal Navy. She was launched in 1893, reduced to harbour service from 1910 and was sold for scrapping in 1919.

== Design ==
The Alarm class was designed by Sir William White in 1889. They had a length overall of 242 ft (74 m), a beam of 27 ft (8.2 m) and a displacement of 810 long tons (820 t). Antelope was engined by Yarrows with two sets of vertical triple-expansion steam engines, two locomotive-type boilers, and twin screws. This layout produced 3,500 indicated horsepower (2,600 kW), giving her a speed of 18.7 knots (34.6 km/h; 21.5 mph) with forced draught. She carried between 100 and 160 tons of coal and was crewed by 91 sailors and officers.

== Armament ==
When built Antelope was fitted with two QF 4.7-inch (12 cm)/45-pounder guns, four 3-pounder guns and one Gardner machine gun. Her three 18-inch torpedo tubes (Note: British "18 inch" torpedoes were 17.72 inches (45.0 cm) in diameter) were arranged as a pair of revolving deck mounts and a single bow-mounted tube; three reloads were provided.

== History ==
=== Construction ===
Antelope was laid down at Devonport Dockyard on 21 October 1889. Construction was delayed by several months by problems with the ship's propeller shafts. She was finally launched, by Miss Crocker, the daughter of the shipyard manager on 12 July 1893. In 2015, her grandson displayed a commemorative wooden box, holding the mallet and chisel she used to sever the rope tethering the ship, on the BBC programme Antiques Roadshow. The ship was completed in May 1894 at a cost of £61,395.

=== Service ===
In August 1894 Antelope took part in that year's Naval Manoeuvres, and in July 1896 again took part in the Manoeuvres. On 26 June 1897 she was present at the Fleet Review at Spithead in celebration of Queen Victoria's Diamond Jubilee, and in July that year took part in the Reserve Fleet Manoeuvres. In April 1899, it was announced that Antelope was to be allocated to training of naval reserves, supporting the training hulk Daedalus at Bristol.

On 27 June 1900 it was announced that the date of the mobilization for naval manoeuvres had been fixed for 10 July. Antelope, together with capital ships, cruisers, torpedo boats and other torpedo gunboats, was ordered to be ready for sea, and participated as part of 'Fleet B'. In July the next year Antelope took part in the 1901 manoeuvres.

Commander Henry Arthur Phillips was appointed in command in early May 1902, and in July 1902 she rejoined the Channel and Home squadrons. She took part in the fleet review held at Spithead on 16 August 1902 for the coronation of King Edward VII. Commander William Nicholson was appointed in command on 10 September 1902.

Antelope had been stricken from the effective list by 1905, being described in Parliament as being "of comparatively small fighting value", although her armament was not removed. Torpedo gunboats that had been re-boilered and re-engined were considered still effective and retained in service, but it was not felt worthwhile to re-engine the remaining torpedo gunboats, such as Antelope. Antelope was reduced to harbour service from 1910 and used as a training ship at Devonport.

In July 1914 she was listed for sale at Devonport. Following the outbreak of the First World War, Antelope returned to training duties at Devonport, where she was used for training of stokers. Antelope was sold to T R Sales for breaking on 27 May 1919.

== Pennant numbers ==
| Pennant number | From |
|---|---|
| D25 | 1914 |
| N25 | September 1915 |

== Bibliography ==
- Brassey, T. A., ed. (1895). The Naval Annual 1895. Portsmouth, UK: J Griffin and Co.
- Brassey, T. A., ed. (1897). The Naval Annual 1897. Portsmouth, UK: J Griffin and Co.
- Brassey, T. A., ed. (1898). The Naval Annual 1898. Portsmouth, UK: J Griffin and Co.
- Brassey, T. A., ed. (1902). The Naval Annual 1902. Portsmouth, UK: J Griffin and Co.
- Brassey, T. A., ed. (1905). The Naval Annual 1905. Portsmouth, UK: J Griffin and Co.
- Brown, Les (2023). Royal Navy Torpedo Vessels. Barnsley, UK: Seaforth Publishing. ISBN 978-1-3990-2285-9.
- Colledge, J. J.; Warlow, Ben (2006) [1969]. Ships of the Royal Navy: The Complete Record of All Fighting Ships of the Royal Navy from the 15th Century to the Present (3rd Rev ed.). London: Chatham Publishing. ISBN 978-1-86176-281-8. OCLC 67375475.
- Dittmar, F. J.; Colledge, J. J. (1972). British Warships 1914–1919. Shepperton, UK: Ian Allan. ISBN 0-7110-0380-7.
- Friedman, Norman (2009). British Destroyers: From Earliest Days to the Second World War. Barnsley, UK: Seaforth Publishing. ISBN 978-1-84832-049-9.
- Leyland, John, ed. (1901). The Naval Annual 1901. Portsmouth, UK: J Griffin and Co.
- Lyon, David & Winfield, Rif (2004). The Sail and Steam Navy List: All the Ships of the Royal Navy 1815–1889. Chatham Publishing. ISBN 978-1-86176-032-6. OCLC 52620555.
