= HMS Speedy (1893) =

Gunboat of the Royal Navy

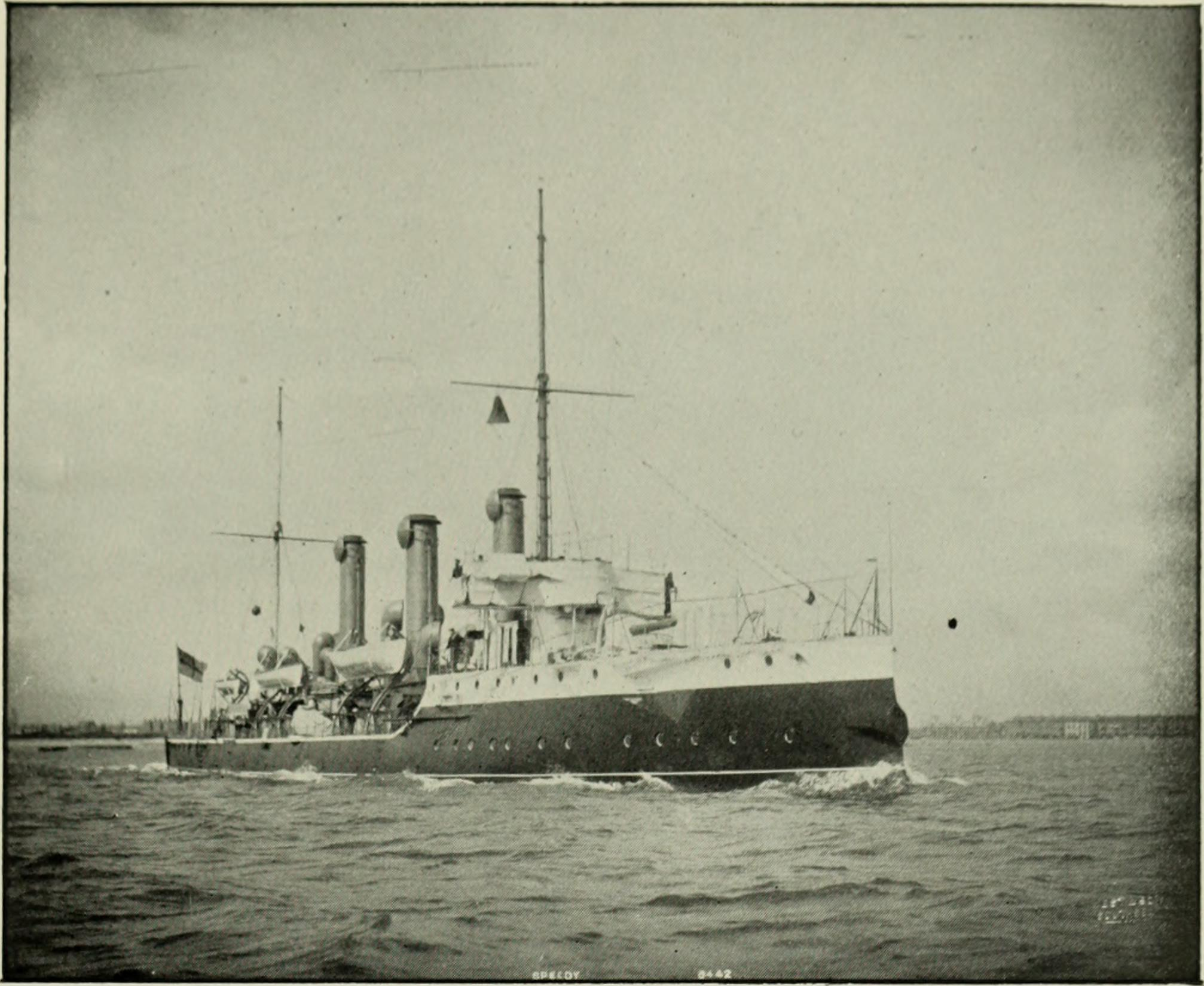

History

United Kingdom
- Name: HMS Speedy
- Builder: Thornycroft
- Laid down: 4 January 1892
- Launched: 18 June 1893
- Completed: 20 February 1894
- Fate: Sunk 3 September 1914

General characteristics
- Class & type: Alarm-class torpedo gunboat
- Displacement: 810 long tons (820 t)
- Length: 230 ft 0 in (70.10 m) pp
- Beam: 27 ft 0 in (8.23 m)
- Draught: 12 ft 0 in (3.66 m)
- Installed power: 3,500 ihp (2,600 kW)
- Propulsion: 2× triple expansion steam engines; 2 shafts
- Speed: 18.7 kn (21.5 mph; 34.6 km/h)
- Complement: 91
- Armament: 2 × 4.7 in (120 mm) QF guns; 4 × 3-pounder (47 mm ) guns; 1 × Gardiner machine gun; 3 × 18 inch torpedo tubes

HMS Speedy was an Alarm-class torpedo gunboat of the British Royal Navy. She was built by Thornycroft from 1892–1894. She was converted to a minesweeper in 1908–1909 and continued these duties during the First World War. Speedy was sunk by a German mine on 3 September 1914.

== Design and construction ==
Speedy was one of 11 Alarm-class torpedo gunboats ordered for the Royal Navy under the 1889 Naval Defence Act, which authorised the shipbuilding programme for the next five years, and also included the last two torpedo gunboats of the Sharpshooter-class and the five torpedo gunboats of the Dryad-class. The Alarms were slightly modified versions of the previous Sharpshooter-class, with modified engines to improve reliability.

Speedy was 230 feet (70.10 m) long between perpendiculars, with a beam of 27 feet (8.23 m) and a draught of 12 feet (3.66 m). Displacement was 810 long tons (820 t). Speedy differed from other ships of her class in having eight Thornycroft water-tube boilers rather than the locomotive boilers used for the rest of the class, with three funnels being fitted instead of two. The boilers fed two sets of triple-expansion steam engines rated at 3,500 indicated horsepower (2,600 kW), driving two Gunmetal propellers with a diameter of 8 ft 3 in (2.51 m) which gave a design speed of 18.7 knots (21.5 mph; 34.6 km/h). The revised machinery arrangements were much more reliable and made it easier to maintain high speed.

The ship was armed with two 4.7 inch (120 mm) QF guns mounted fore and aft on the ship's centreline, backed up by four 3-pounder (47 mm) guns (two in single mounts on the ship's beam and two in casemates forward) and a single .45-inch Gardner machine gun. Three 18-inch (450 mm) torpedo tubes were fitted, with one fixed in the ship's bow and the other two on swivelling mounts on the beam. The ship had a crew of 91.

HMS Speedy being launched at Chiswick on 18 May 1893

Speedy was laid down at Thornycroft's Chiswick shipyard on 4 January 1892 and was launched on 18 May 1893. She reached a speed of 20.21 knots (23.26 mph; 37.43 km/h) during sea trials, when her engines delivered 4,703 indicated horsepower (3,507 kW). The ship was completed on 20 February 1894, and was the sixth ship of that name to serve with the Royal Navy.

== Service ==
Speedy was subject to extensive tests of her boilers, which proved successful, demonstrating the reliability and performance of water-tube boilers, helping to pave the way for more widespread use of these boilers by the Royal Navy.

In August 1894 Speedy took part in that year's Naval Manoeuvres. In January 1896 Speedy served as despatch vessel to the Channel Squadron, and in July 1896 again took part in the Manoeuvres. On 26 June 1897 Speedy was present at the Jubilee Fleet Review at Spithead, following that by taking part in the Naval Manoeuvres that July.

In 1898, Speedy was deployed to Gibraltar, but was forced to return to Britain to have her boilers re-tubed after suffering problems on the journey out. She later returned to the Mediterranean, where she stayed until returning to Home waters in 1905. From November that year to late January 1903 she travelled to Port Said and through the Suez Canal for a visit to Suez, Suakin, Perim, Hodeida and Aden. She was back at Malta where she paid off on 4 February 1903, then recommissioned the following day.

In 1906 Speedy was deployed on Coastguard duties at Harwich, and collided with a merchant ship in June that year. Speedy joined the Home Fleet in 1907, and in 1909 was attached to the Nore destroyer flotilla.

Speedy was converted to a minesweeper in 1909, which involved removing the torpedo tubes. She had her boilers re-tubed in 1911, rejoining the Nore division of the Home Fleet after this refit was complete.

=== First World War ===
On 19 August 1914, the destroyer Orwell, part of the 7th Destroyer Flotilla, reported being chased by a three-funnelled enemy cruiser of the Königsberg-class or Dresden-class off the Outer Dowsing. After investigation, it was found that the "hostile cruiser" was in fact Speedy.

On the night of 25 August 1914, the German minelayer Nautilus, accompanied by the light cruiser Mainz and the torpedo-boats of the 3rd Half Flotilla, laid a minefield off the mouth of the Humber estuary, while Albatross laid another minefield off the River Tyne. When the minefield was discovered, Speedy and the gunboat Spanker were ordered to clear the minefield off the Humber. On 2 September 1914, Speedy accompanied the drifter Eyrie and two other trawlers to sweep the Humber minefield when Eyrie struck a mine and sunk, killing six of her crew. The next day, Speedy and the drifters Lindsell, Wishful and Achievable were again sweeping the Humber field when Lindsell struck a mine and sank, killing five. Speedy lowered boats to rescue the survivors of Lindsell's crew, but struck a mine herself, sinking an hour later. One of Speedy's crew was killed. The loss of three minesweepers in two days resulted in the Admiralty changing its policy on dealing with minefields – rather than clearing entire minefields, clear channels would be swept through minefields to give a safe route for shipping.

== Bibliography ==
- Brassey, T. A., ed. (1895). The Naval Annual 1895. Portsmouth, UK: J Griffin and Co.
- Brassey, T. A., ed. (1897). The Naval Annual 1897. Portsmouth, UK: J Griffin and Co.
- Brassey, T. A., ed. (1898). The Naval Annual 1898. Portsmouth, UK: J Griffin and Co.
- Brassey, T. A., ed. (1902). The Naval Annual 1902. Portsmouth, UK: J Griffin and Co.
- Brassey, T. A., ed. (1905). The Naval Annual 1905. Portsmouth, UK: J Griffin and Co.
- Brown, D. K. (2003). Warrior to Dreadnought: Warship Development 1860–1905. London: Chatham Publishing. ISBN 1-84067-5292.
- Brown, Les (2023). Royal Navy Torpedo Vessels. Barnsley, UK: Seaforth Publishing. ISBN 978-1-3990-2285-9.
- Colledge, J. J.; Warlow, Ben (2006). ships of the Royal Navy: The Complete Record of all Fighting Ships of the Royal Navy from the 15th Century to the Present. London: Chatham Publishing. ISBN 9781861762818.
- Chesneau, Roger; Kolesnik, Eugene M., eds. (1979). Conway's All the World's Fighting Ships 1860–1905. London: Conway Maritime Press. ISBN 0-85177-133-5.
- Dittmar, F. J.; Colledge, J. J. (1972). British Warships 1914–1919. Shepperton, UK: Ian Allan. ISBN 0-7110-0380-7.
- Friedman, Norman (2009). British Destroyers: From Earliest Days to the Second World War. Barnsley, UK: Seaforth Publishing. ISBN 978-1-84832-049-9.
- Gardiner, Robert; Gray, Randal, eds. (1985). Conway's All The World's Fighting Ships 1906–1921. London: Conway Maritime Press. ISBN 0-85177-245-5.
- "H.M.S. Speedy". The Engineer. 10 November 1893. p. 439.
- Kemp, Paul (1999). The Admiralty Regrets: British Warship Losses of the 20th Century. Stroud, UK: Sutton Publishing. ISBN 0-7509-1567-6.
- Monograph No. 7: The Patrol Flotillas at the Commencement of the War (PDF). Naval Staff Monographs (Historical). Vol. III. Naval Staff, Training and Staff Duties Division. 1921. pp. 71–107.
- Monograph No. 23: Home Waters Part I: From the Outbreak of War to 27 August 1914 (PDF). Naval Staff Monographs (Historical). Vol. X. Naval Staff, Training and Staff Duties Division. 1924.
- Monograph No. 24: Home Waters Part II: September and October 1914 (PDF). Naval Staff Monographs (Historical). Vol. XI. Naval Staff, Training and Staff Duties Division. 1924.
