= Alarm-class torpedo gunboat =

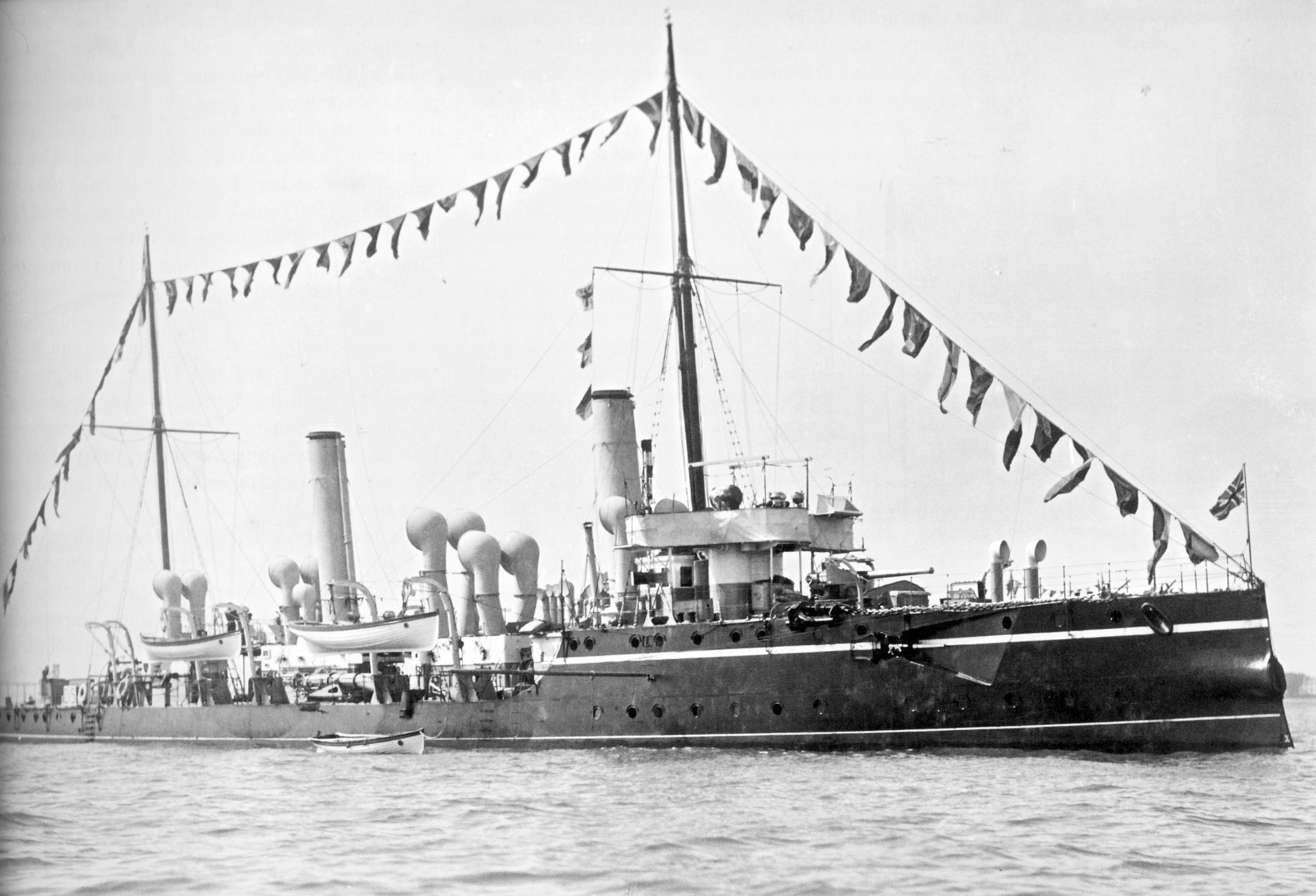
- HMS Jason

Class overview
- Name: Alarm class
- Builders: Naval Construction & Armament, Barrow; Laird Brothers, Birkenhead; Devonport Dockyard; Sheerness Dockyard; Thornycroft, Chiswick
- Operators: Royal Navy
- Preceded by: Sharpshooter class
- Succeeded by: Dryad class
- Built: 1892–1893
- In commission: 1893–1924
- Completed: 11
- Lost: 3
- Scrapped: 8

General characteristics
- Type: Torpedo gunboat
- Displacement: 810 long tons (820 t)
- Length: 242 ft (74 m)
- Beam: 27 ft (8.2 m)
- Draught: 12 ft 6 in (3.81 m) maximum
- Installed power: Locomotive boilers; (except Speedy - water-tube boilers); 3,500 ihp (2,600 kW); except Speedy - 5,000 ihp (3,700 kW)
- Propulsion: 2 triple-expansion steam engines; 2 screws
- Speed: 18.7 knots (34.6 km/h; 21.5 mph)
- Complement: 91
- Armament: Jason, Hebe, Circe, Onyx, Leda: 1 × fixed bow 14 in (360 mm) torpedo tube; 2 × revolving 14 in torpedo tubes; 2 × fixed 14 in torpedo tubes; 2 × QF 4.7 in (120 mm) guns; 4 × 3-pounder guns; 1 × Gardner machine gun; Alarm, Jaseur, Niger, Reynard, Speedy, Antelope: 1 × fixed bow 18 in (450 mm) torpedo tube; 2 × revolving 18 in torpedo tubes; 2 × QF 4.7 in guns; 4 × 3-pounder guns; 1 × Gardner machine gun

The Alarm-class torpedo gunboat was the penultimate class of torpedo gunboat built for the Royal Navy. The class was contemporary with the early torpedo boat destroyers, which were faster and thus better suited to pursue enemy torpedo boats. By the First World War, ships of the class had either been sold, converted to submarine depot ships or minesweepers, or reduced to harbour service. Three of the 11 completed torpedo gunboats of the Alarm class were lost during the war while serving in the minesweeping role.

== Design ==
The Alarm class was designed by Sir William White in 1889 as an enlarged version of his previous Sharpshooter class. They had a length overall of 242 feet (74 m), a beam of 27 ft (8.2 m) and a displacement of 810 long tons (820 t). They mounted two sets of vertical triple-expansion steam engines, two locomotive boilers, and twin screws. This layout produced 3,500 indicated horsepower (2,600 kW), giving them a speed of 18.7 knots (34.6 km/h; 21.5 mph) with forced draught. They carried between 100 and 160 tons of coal and were crewed by 91 sailors and officers.

=== Thornycroft Special - HMS Speedy ===
While officially classed with the Alarm class, Speedy was actually a separate design. The Naval Defence Act of 1889 authorised the purchase of an Alarm-class torpedo gunboat built to a design by John I. Thornycroft & Company at their yard at Chiswick. Speedy was a three-funnelled vessel (compared to the two-funnelled Admiralty design), but the key difference was the use of water-tube boilers instead of locomotive-type boilers; she produced at least 5,000 indicated horsepower (3,700 kW) and could make 20.5 knots (38.0 km/h; 23.6 mph). The use of water-tube boilers was a key feature of the new torpedo boat destroyers that would make torpedo gunboats (including the Alarm class) obsolete.

Speedy being launched at Chiswick, 18 May 1893

== Armament ==
At build the class was fitted with two QF 4.7-inch (120 mm)/45-pounder guns, four 3-pounder guns and one Gardner machine gun. Five 14-inch (360 mm) torpedo tubes were fitted in the first five vessels, but this was changed to three 18-inch (450 mm) torpedo tubes in the rest of the class. They were arranged as a pair of revolving deck mounts, a pair of fixed deck mounts (deleted in the later vessels) and a single bow-mounted tube; three reloads were provided.

== Ships ==
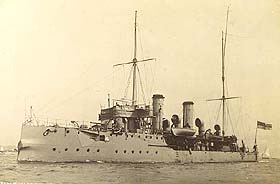
Niger

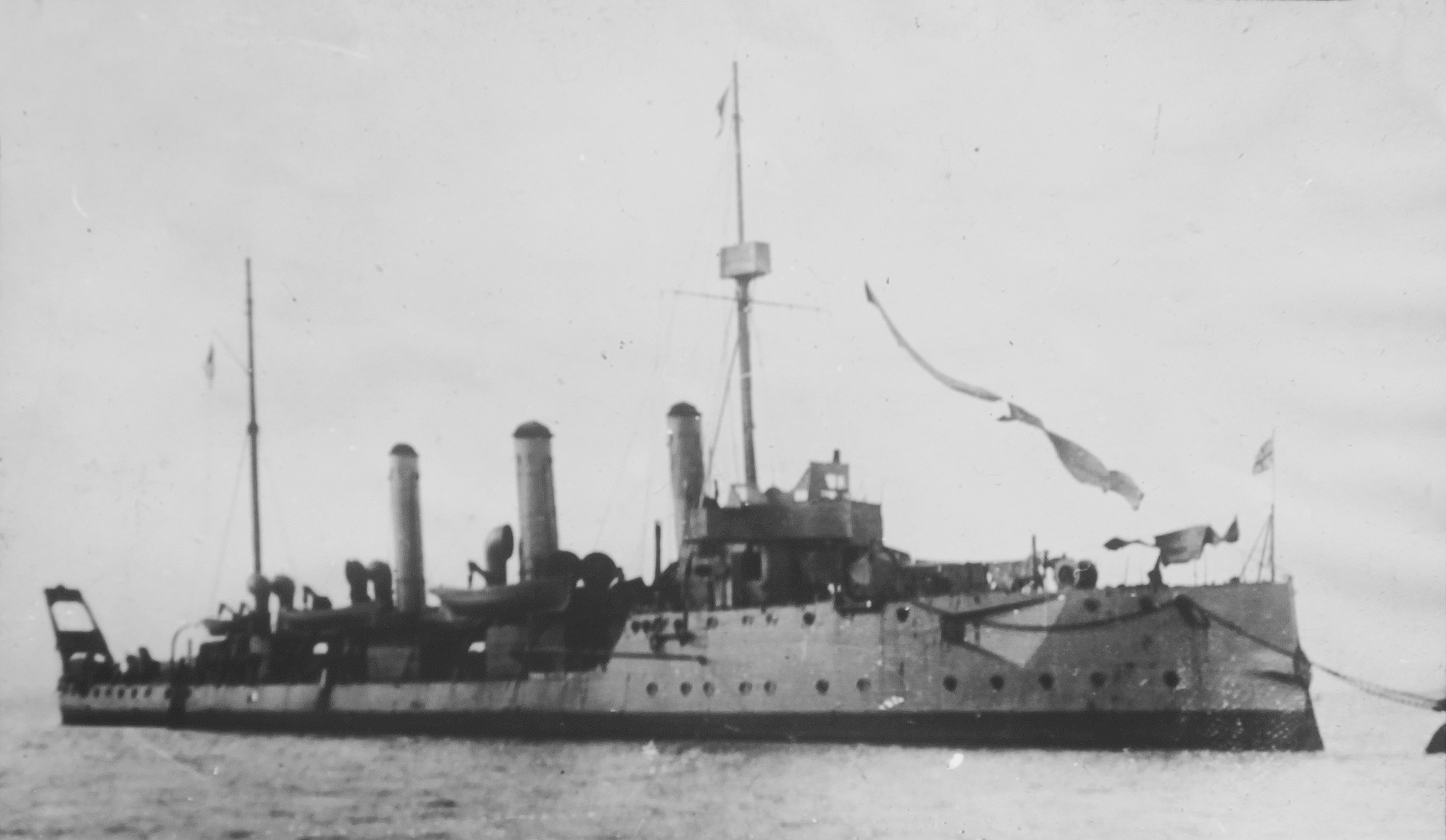
Speedy

Name	Ship Builder	Laid down	Launched	Completed	Fate
Jason	Naval Construction & Armament, Barrow	7 September 1891	14 May 1892	June 1893	Became a minesweeper in 1909. Sunk by a mine off the west coast of Scotland on 7 April 1917
Circe	Sheerness Dockyard	11 January 1890	14 June 1892	May 1893	Became a minesweeper in 1909. Sold for breaking on 30 July 1920
Hebe	Sheerness Dockyard	11 January 1890	15 June 1892	9 October 1894	Became a minesweeper in 1909. Became a depot ship for submarines in 1910 (guns retained). Sold for breaking on 22 October 1919
Onyx	Laird Brothers, Birkenhead	8 October 1891	7 September 1892	January 1894	Became a depot ship for submarines in 1907 (armament removed). Renamed Vulcan II in June 1919 (or April 1920?). Sold for breaking in August 1924; resold on 9 October 1924 to Basso & Monger, Weymouth for demolition
Leda	Sheerness Dockyard	25 June 1891	13 September 1892	November 1893	Became a minesweeper in 1909. Sold for breaking on 14 July 1920 and broken up in Germany in 1922
Alarm	Sheerness Dockyard	25 June 1891	13 September 1892	March 1894	Sold for breaking on 9 April 1907
Jaseur	Naval Construction & Armament, Barrow	14 September 1891	24 September 1892	July 1893	Sold on 11 July 1905
Renard	Laird Brothers, Birkenhead	26 October 1891	6 December 1892	January 1894	Sold for breaking on 4 April 1905
Niger	Naval Construction & Armament, Barrow	17 September 1891	17 December 1892	25 April 1893	Became a minesweeper in 1909. Torpedoed by U-12 off Deal on 11 November 1914
Speedy	Thornycroft, Chiswick	4 January 1892	18 May 1893	20 February 1894	Became a minesweeper in 1909. Sunk by a mine off the Humber on 3 September 1914
Antelope	Devonport Dockyard	21 October 1889	12 July 1893	May 1894	Reduced to harbour service in 1910 and used as training ship at Devonport. Sold for breaking on 27 May 1919

== Bibliography ==
- Brown, Les (2023). Royal Navy Torpedo Vessels. Seaforth Publishing. ISBN 978-1-3990-2285-9.
- Colledge, J. J.; Warlow, Ben & Bush, Steve (2020). Ships of the Royal Navy: The Complete Record of all Fighting Ships of the Royal Navy from the 15th Century to the Present (5th revised and updated ed.). Seaforth Publishing. ISBN 978-1-5267-9327-0.
- Lyon, David & Winfield, Rif (2004). The Sail and Steam Navy List: All the Ships of the Royal Navy 1815–1889. Chatham Publishing. ISBN 978-1-86176-032-6. OCLC 52620555.
