= HMS Myrmidon (1867) =

Gunvessel of the Royal Navy

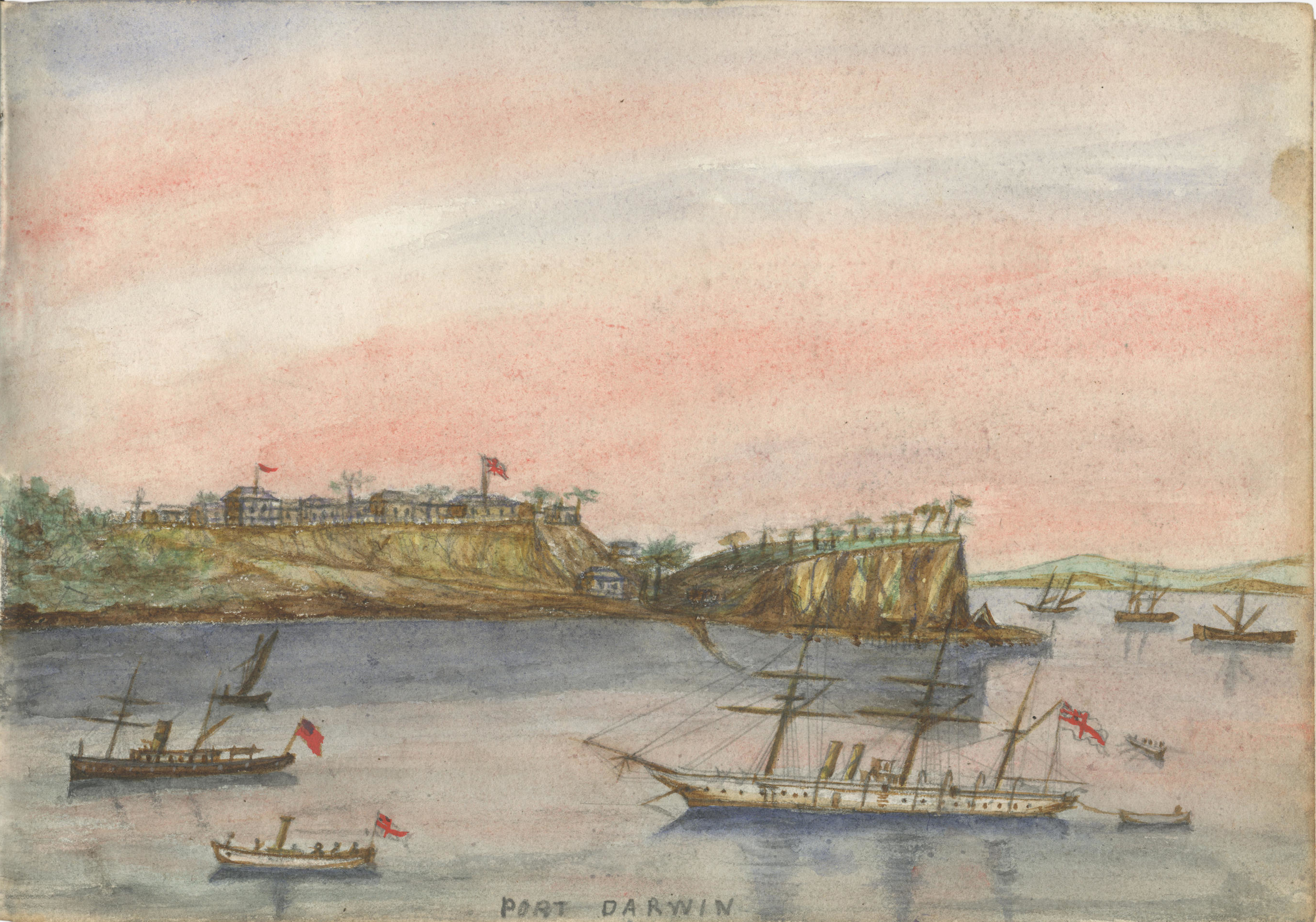
- Myrmidon at Port Darwin, by one her crew, circa 1886

History

United Kingdom
- Name: HMS Myrmidon
- Namesake: The Myrmidons
- Ordered: 5 March 1860
- Builder: Chatham Dockyard
- Laid down: 24 July 1860
- Launched: 5 June 1867
- Commissioned: October 1867
- Fate: Sold at Hong Kong, 1889

General characteristics
- Class & type: Cormorant-class first-class gunvessel
- Displacement: 877 tons
- Tons burthen: 694/66/94 bm
- Length: 185 ft 0 in (56.4 m) (overall); 165 ft 7 1/4 in (50.5 m) (keel)
- Beam: 28 ft 4 in (8.6 m)
- Draught: 11–12 ft (3.4–3.7 m)
- Depth of hold: 14 ft 0 in (4.3 m)
- Installed power: 200 nhp; 782 ihp (583 kW)
- Propulsion: 2-cylinder horizontal single-expansion steam engine; Single screw
- Sail plan: Barque
- Speed: 10.8 knots (20.0 km/h) (under steam)
- Complement: 90
- Armament: 1 × 7-inch/110 pdr Armstrong breech-loading gun; 1 × 68 pdr muzzle-loading smoothbore gun; 2 × 20 pdr Armstrong breech-loading gun

HMS Myrmidon was a Cormorant-class gunvessel of the Royal Navy, built at Chatham Dockyard and launched in 1867. She served on the North America and West Indies Station and surveyed parts of the Australian coast before being sold at Hong Kong in 1889.

== Design ==
=== Propulsion ===
The first six ships had a 2-cylinder horizontal single-expansion steam engine provided by Robert Napier and Sons and rated at 200 nominal horsepower, driving a single screw. Sylvia and Nassau were completed as survey ships and were powered by 150 nhp Humphreys and Tennant engines, and Myrmidon, the last of the completed Cormorants, received a more powerful 200 nhp Humphreys and Tennant engine.

=== Armament ===
The main armament, which was principally intended for shore bombardment, was originally designed with two 68-pounder and two 32-pounder muzzle-loading smoothbore guns. They were finished, however, with a single 7-inch/110-pounder Armstrong breech-loading gun and a 68-pounder muzzle-loading smoothbore gun. A pair of broadside 20-pounder Armstrong breech-loading guns were also fitted. The 68-pounders were later replaced by a pair of 64-pounder muzzle-loading rifled guns.

=== Sail plan ===
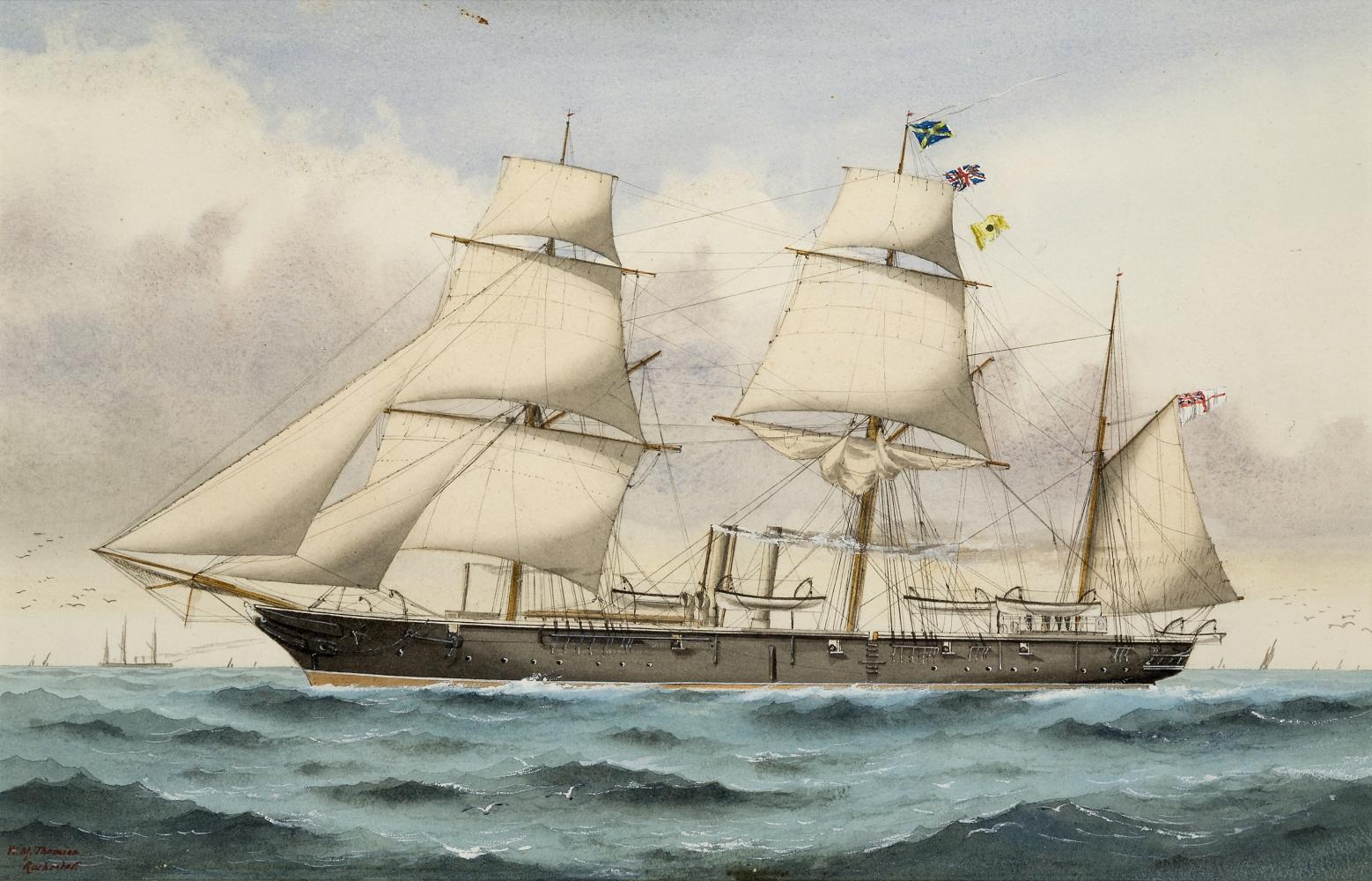
HMS Myrmidon by William Mackenzie Thomson

In common with all other Royal Navy wooden screw gunvessels, the Cormorants were rigged as barques, that is with three masts, with the fore and main masts square rigged, and the mizzen fore-and-aft rigged.

== Construction ==
The first 6 ships were ordered from commercial yards (Money Wigram & Sons, C J Mare & Co and J Scott Russell). A further batch of 4 ships (including Myrmidon) were ordered on 5 March 1860 and the final batch of 3 (Pegasus – Guernsey) on 25 March 1862. The first completed ships had a draught of 11–12 feet (3.4–3.7 m), exceeding the intended 8 feet (2.4 m) by a considerable margin. Since gunvessels were intended to work in shallow water while bombarding the shore, work on the later two batches was suspended. Sylvia, Nassau and Myrmidon were suspended in 1862 or 1863, but were resumed, being finished as survey vessels. (Note: Preston claims that Myrmidon was completed as a survey vessel; Winfield states only that she was a survey vessel by 1888.) She was launched on 5 June 1867 and commissioned in October 1867.

== Operational service ==
Myrmidon commenced service on the North America and West Indies Station. She served on the Australia Station from 14 March 1885 and undertook hydrographic surveys along the Australian coastline until she left the Australia Station in 1888. In April 1887 she was involved in a collision with the troopship HMS Tyne near Sydney.

== Fate ==
She sailed to Hong Kong and was sold in April 1889 for £3000. Her eventual fate is unknown.
