= Beacon-class gunvessel =

British class of composite gunboats

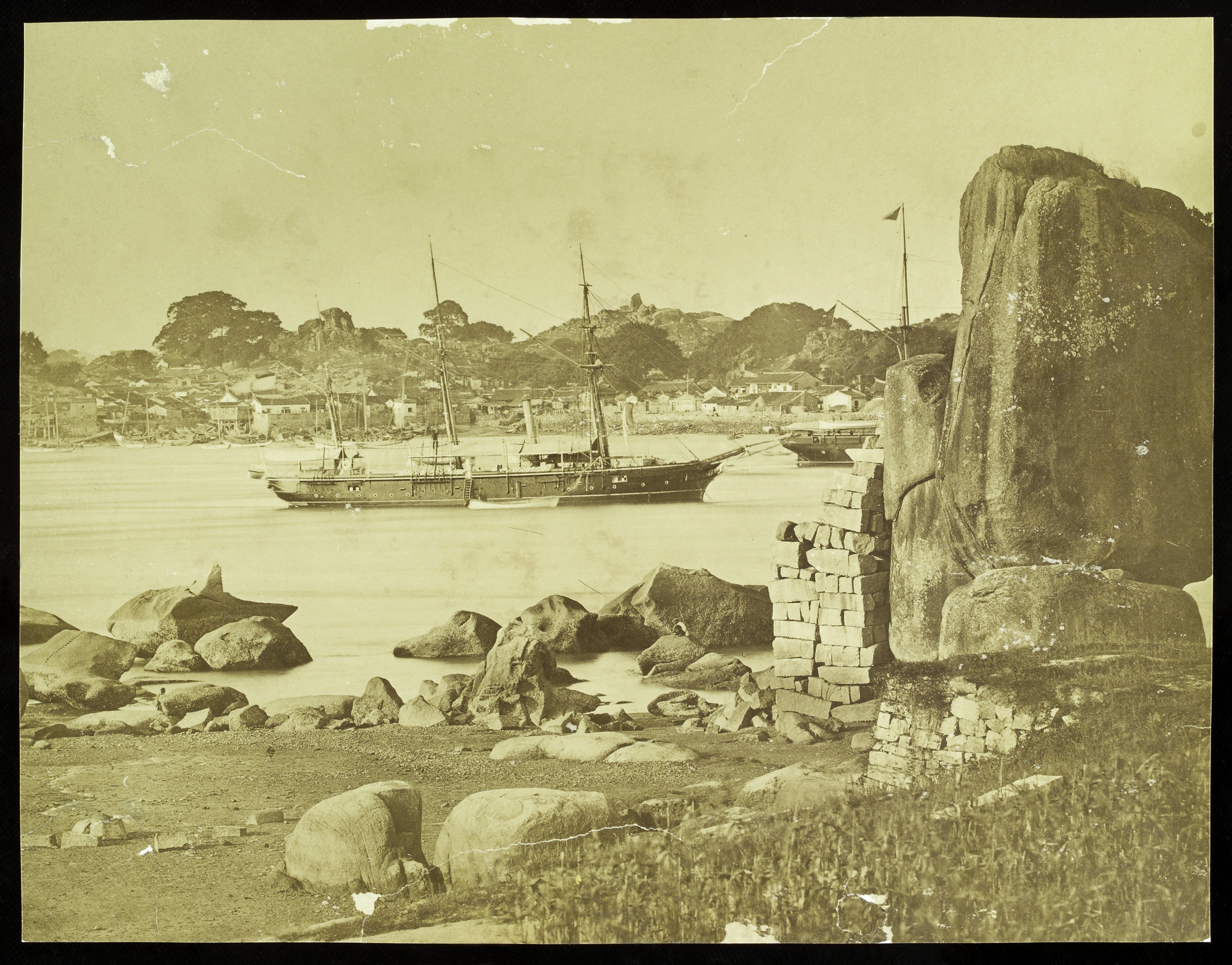
- HMS Hornet

Class overview
- Name: Beacon class
- Operators: Royal Navy
- Preceded by: Plover class
- Succeeded by: Frolic class
- Built: 1867–1868
- Completed: 18
- Lost: 1
- Scrapped: 17

General characteristics (as built)
- Type: Composite screw gunvessel
- Displacement: 603 long tons (613 t)
- Tons burthen: 464 bm
- Length: 155 ft (47.2 m) (p/p)
- Beam: 25 ft (7.6 m)
- Draught: 9 ft 6 in (2.9 m) (maximum)
- Depth: 11 ft (3.4 m)
- Installed power: 3 × cylindrical boilers; 472–641 ihp (352–478 kW)
- Propulsion: 2 shafts; 2 × steam engines
- Sail plan: Barque rig
- Speed: 9–10 knots (17–19 km/h; 10–12 mph)
- Complement: 80
- Armament: 1 × 7-inch rifled muzzle-loading gun; 1 × 6.3-inch 64-pounder rifled muzzle-loading gun; 2 × 20-pounder rifled breech-loading guns

The Beacon-class gunvessels were a class of composite gunboats built for the Royal Navy in the late 1860s. They were the first warships of the Royal Navy expressly designed to use the engines of an older class of ships with a different hull shape. They were generally deployed overseas to the China, East Indies, West Africa, Pacific, North America and West Indies Stations. In addition to showing the flag, the ships fought pirates and suppressed the slave trade in East and West Africa. As their engines wore out in the mid-1880s, they were mostly retired and scrapped by the end of the decade. A few survived into the early 1900s as they were modified for harbour service before being sold or scrapped.

== Design and description ==
These ships were designed by Sir Edward Reed, the Director of Naval Construction, as replacements for the various gunvessels built for the Crimean War. Being built of green timber, their hulls were starting to rot after a decade or more in service, but their engines were still generally sound. As the older ships were broken up their engines were salvaged and transferred to Beacon-class ships under construction. Combat experience against Chinese fortifications had shown that the single 32-pounder smoothbore armament of the earlier ships was not powerful enough so Reed was directed to prepare a twin-screw, shallow draft design suitable for riverine operations that incorporated a pair of steam engines from the older gunboats, a heavy armament, and enough freeboard to allow for service at sea. These rather contradictory requirements forced Reed to discard traditional wooden framing for these ships and the Beacon class became the first ships of the Royal Navy to be framed in iron with wooden planking.

The ships were 155 feet (47.2 m) long between perpendiculars and had a beam of 25 feet (7.6 m). Forward, the ships had a draught of 7 feet 9 inches (2.4 m), but aft they drew 9 ft 6 in (2.9 m). They displaced 603 long tons (613 t) as built and had a burthen of 464 tons. The depth of hold was 11 feet (3.4 m) and the hull was subdivided by watertight bulkheads. Their crew consisted of 80 officers and enlisted men.

Two different types of engines were used with this class. Twelve ships received two-cylinder horizontal return connecting rod engines built by Maudslay, Sons and Field while the remaining six got two-cylinder horizontal trunk engines from John Penn and Sons. Each engine powered a single 6-foot (1.8 m) propeller. The engines produced between 472 and 641 indicated horsepower (352 and 478 kW) which gave the ships a maximum speed between 9 and 10 knots (17 and 19 km/h; 10 and 12 mph). Three cylindrical boilers provided steam to the engines, although the working pressure varied; the ships with trunk engines used 80 psi (552 kPa; 6 kgf/cm^{2}) while the other engines used 60 psi (414 kPa; 4 kgf/cm^{2}). The ships carried 90 long tons (91 t) of coal although no range figures are available.

To minimise their draught the Beacons were given a very full hull shape with squared-off bilges and a flat bottom. Admiral G. A. Ballard commented that they were built "along the lines of an extremely elongated packing crate." This made them steady gun platforms and gave them quite a bit of buoyancy. If they ran aground, this shape allowed them to be pulled off easily and they remained upright if stranded by a receding tide. However, this hull shape made their steering erratic at low speeds or in a following sea and they made a large amount of leeway in a strong side breeze.

The class was barque rigged and their best speed under sail alone was over 12 knots (22 km/h; 14 mph) if running before the wind, despite the drag of the propellers, which could neither be hoisted out of the water, nor feathered. In a headwind, Ballard described them as "quite unmanageable under sail alone", while Preston claims they "sailed like tea trays". Their funnels were hinged to lower horizontally to reduce wind resistance while under sail. Avon, Dwarf and Elk were re-rigged as barquentines after 1880. A poop deck was added in between commissions to some of the ships, but this was the only major structural change made during their careers.

The ships were initially armed with a mix of 7-inch and 64-pounder 56 cwt (Note: "cwt" is the abbreviation for hundredweight, 56 cwt referring to the weight of the gun.) rifled muzzle-loading guns and a pair of 20-pounder rifled breechloading guns. The 7-inch (178 mm) and 64-pounder guns were mounted on the centreline as pivot guns while the two 20-pounder guns were mounted at the bow and stern as chase guns. The 16-calibre 7-inch gun weighed 6.5 long tons (6.6 t) and fired a 112-pound (50.8 kg) shell. It was credited with the nominal ability to penetrate 7.7-inch (196 mm) armour. A lighter, 4.5-long-ton (4.6 t), 7-inch gun developed in the 1870s replaced the heavier gun in Avon and Elk. It replaced both heavy guns in Lynx, Hornet, Flirt, and Rocket.

== Ships ==
Name	Ship builder	Launched	Fate
Beacon	Chatham Dockyard	17 August 1867	Sold, December 1888
Avon	Portsmouth Dockyard	2 October 1867	Sold, 26 April 1890
Gnat	Pembroke Dockyard	26 November 1867	Wrecked on Balabac Island, 15 November 1868
Cracker	Portsmouth Dockyard	27 November 1867	Broken up, 1889
Dwarf	Woolwich Dockyard	28 November 1867	Broken up, April 1886
Flirt	Devonport Dockyard	20 December 1867	Sold, November 1888
Fly	Devonport Dockyard	20 December 1867	Sold, November 1887
Elk	Portsmouth Dockyard	10 January 1868	To the coastguard, 1887. Tug, 1890. Sold for service as a dredger, 1905
Boxer	Deptford Dockyard	25 January 1868	Sold, June 1887
Thistle	Deptford Dockyard	25 January 1868	Sold, November 1888
Hornet	Pearse, Lockwood & Company, Stockton-on-Tees	10 March 1868	Sold, 1889
Rocket	London Eng. Company, Poplar, London	8 April 1868	Sold, December 1888
Lynx	Harland & Wolff, Belfast	25 April 1868	Sold, December 1888
Teazer	Laird Brothers, Birkenhead	28 April 1868	Broken up, December 1887
Midge	Randolph & Elder, Govan	21 May 1868	Sold, 15 March 1907
Pert	Reid & Company, Port Glasgow	22 June 1868	Sold, December 1888
Hart	J. & G. Thomson, Glasgow	20 August 1868	Sold, December 1888
Growler	James Lawrie, Whiteinch, Glasgow	1 December 1868	Sold, November 1887

== Service ==
These ships were primarily designed for service in Southeast Asian waters, including the rivers, and most of the ships spent at least one commission there. Hornet, Midge, and Gnat spent their whole careers there. Gnat's service, however, was rather short as she ran aground and was wrecked on Balabac Island, south of the Philippines, less than a year after she was commissioned. Their duties included protecting British lives and property and fighting pirates. Another major deployment area was the Gulf of Guinea in West Africa where Fly, Lynx, Flirt, Dwarf, Beacon, Avon, Pert, Growler, Rocket, Hart, and Boxer all spent part of one or more commissions. Beacon supported British coastal operations during the Third Anglo-Ashanti War in 1873 while most of the others engaged river pirates at various times. Rocket, Elk, Dwarf, Beacon, and Avon served at least one commission off the south-east coast of South America, while Cracker spent her entire career there. Dwarf made a port visit to Asunción, on the Paraguay River, some 600 miles (970 km) from the ocean during one of her tours in the region. Teazer, Lynx, Beacon, and Thistle each made one deployment to the East Indies Station where they helped to suppress the slave trade between East Africa and the Persian Gulf. Beacon, Hart, and Growler were deployed to the Mediterranean where the former participated in the Bombardment of Alexandria in 1882. Fly, Flirt, Boxer, and Pert each spent a commission on fishery patrol on the Grand Banks of Newfoundland. Boxer was also deployed to British Columbia to maintain order with the Indian tribes there.

By the early 1880s, their engines were becoming worn out and most of the ships were placed into reserve for a few years before being sold for breaking up. The machinery of Avon, Dwarf and Elk was in good enough shape that they were assigned as tenders to the coastguard district ships at Hull, Southampton, and Liverpool for a number of years. Growler, Hart and Hornet returned from the China Station to decommission to reserve in England. Midge was also an exception and was retained in Chinese waters until 1907 when she was sold at Hong Kong. Elk lasted nearly as long in harbour service as she was reclassified as a tugboat in 1890 and was then sold as a dredger in 1905. (Note: Ballard, however, says that Elk became a coal hulk.)

== Bibliography ==
- Ballard, G. A. (1941). "British Gunvessels of 1875: The Smaller Twin-Screw Type". Mariner's Mirror. 27 (April): 132–146. doi:10.1080/00253359.1941.10658756.
- Colledge, J. J.; Warlow, Ben (2006) [1969]. Ships of the Royal Navy: The Complete Record of All Fighting Ships of the Royal Navy from the 15th Century to the Present (3rd Rev ed.). London: Chatham Publishing. ISBN 978-1-86176-281-8. OCLC 67375475.
- Lyon, David & Winfield, Rif (2004). The Sail and Steam Navy List: All the Ships of the Royal Navy 1815–1889. Chatham Publishing. ISBN 978-1-86176-032-6. OCLC 52620555.
- Preston, Antony; Major, John (2007). Send a Gunboat: The Victorian Navy and Supremacy at Sea, 1854–1904 (2nd ed.). London: Conway. ISBN 978-0-85177-923-2.
- Roberts, John (1979). "Great Britain (including Empire Forces)". In Chesneau, Roger & Kolesnik, Eugene M. (eds.). Conway's All the World's Fighting Ships 1860–1905. Mayflower Books. pp. 1–113. ISBN 0-8317-0302-4.
