= International Military Antiques =

American memorabilia seller

International Military Antiques, Inc is an American seller of military collectibles and memorabilia, based in Gillette, New Jersey. It was founded in 1981 by Christian Cranmer. His son Alex joined him in 2004. In 2015 Alex Cranmer joined the cast of Pawn Stars on History Channel as the antique gun and militaria expert and has appeared in nearly 100 episodes. Alex Cranmer is the current CEO of International Military Antiques which is located at 1000 Valley Rd, Gillette, NJ 07933.

The National Geographic Channel created a television series about the company titled Family Guns.

Some of the world's prominent museums contain items from IMA, including the National World War II Museum, Natural History Museum of Los Angeles County, and West Point Museum.

They have also supplied the films Saving Private Ryan and the television series Band of Brothers with some of their movie props. INC Magazine wrote an article about IMA titled "When Hollywood Wants to Make an Authentic War Movie, This Is the Company They Call"

== Gurkha collection ==
In 2004 Christian Cranmer completed his 35-year-long attempt to convince the Nepal government to sell him over 50,000 antique firearms. These weapons were part of the arsenal of the Royal Nepalese Gurkha Army, and had been sealed away in the Lagan Silekhana Palace since 1839.
