= Cormorant-class gunvessel =

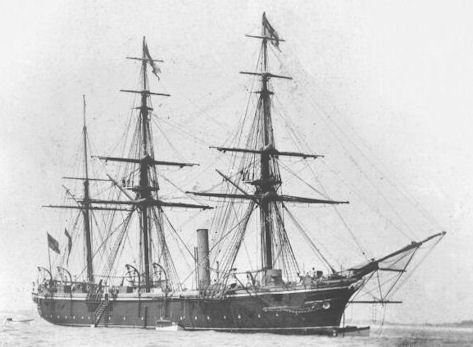
- HMS Cormorant

Class overview
- Name: Cormorant class
- Operators: Royal Navy
- Preceded by: Philomel class
- Succeeded by: Plover class
- Built: 1860-1867
- In service: 1860-1890
- Completed: 9
- Lost: 1
- Scrapped: 8

General characteristics
- Type: First-class gunvessel
- Displacement: 877 tons
- Tons burthen: 694 66/94 bm
- Length: 185 ft 0 in (56.4 m) (overall); 165 ft 7 1/4 in (50.5 m) (keel)
- Beam: 28 ft 4 in (8.6 m)
- Draught: 11–12 ft (3.4–3.7 m)
- Depth of hold: 14 ft 0 in (4.3 m)
- Installed power: 200 nhp; 689–892 ihp (514–665 kW)
- Propulsion: 2-cylinder horizontal single-expansion steam engine; Single screw
- Sail plan: Barque
- Speed: c. 11 knots (20 km/h) (under steam)
- Complement: 90
- Armament: 1 × 7-inch/110-pdr Armstrong breech-loading gun; 1 × 68-pdr muzzle-loading smoothbore gun; 2 × 20-pdr Armstrong breech-loading gun

The Cormorant-class gunvessels (sometimes known as Eclipse-class gunvessels) were a class of 4-gun first-class gunvessels built for the Royal Navy in the 1860s. They were somewhat unsuccessful; intended for shore bombardment in shallow water, they exceeded their design draft by 50%. Seven of the 13 ships ordered were suspended, with 3 finished or converted as survey ships and the other 4 cancelled. Racehorse was wrecked after only 4 years, and those ships that were completed as planned had short operational lives, in some cases less than 10 years. The survey vessels (Myrmidon, Sylvia and Nassau) lasted longest, with the last ship of the class, Sylvia, being broken up in 1890.

== Design ==
=== Propulsion ===
The first 6 ships had a 2-cylinder horizontal single-expansion steam engine provided by Robert Napier and Sons and rated at 200 nominal horsepower, driving a single screw. On trials these units developed between 689 indicated horsepower (514 kW) and 689 indicated horsepower (514 kW), giving speeds of about 11 knots (20 km/h). Sylvia and Nassau were completed as survey ships and were powered by 150 nhp Humphreys and Tennant engines. Myrmidon received a more powerful 200 nhp Humphreys and Tennant engine.

=== Armament ===
The main armament, which was principally intended for shore bombardment, was originally designed with two 68-pounder and two 32-pounder muzzle-loading smoothbore guns. They were finished, however, with a single 7-inch/110-pounder Armstrong breech-loading gun and a 68-pounder muzzle-loading smoothbore gun. A pair of broadside 20-pounder Armstrong breech-loading guns were also fitted. The 68-pounders were later replaced by a pair of 64-pounder muzzle-loading rifled guns.

=== Sail plan ===
In common with all other Royal Navy wooden screw gunvessels, the Cormorants were rigged as barques, that is with three masts, with the fore and main masts square rigged, and the mizzen fore-and-aft rigged.

== Construction ==
The first 6 ships were ordered from commercial yards (Money Wigram & Sons, C J Mare & Co and J Scott Russell), with fitting out to be done in the Royal Dockyards at Chatham (first pair) and Woolwich (last 4). A further batch of 4 ships (Sylvia - Myrmidon) were ordered on 5 March 1860 and another batch of 3 (Pegasus - Guernsey) on 25 March 1862. The first completed ships had a draught of 11–12 feet (3.4–3.7 m), exceeding the intended 8 feet (2.4 m) by a considerable margin. Since gunvessels were intended to work in shallow water while bombarding the shore, work on the later two batches was suspended. Sylvia, Nassau and Myrmidon were suspended in 1862 or 1863, but were resumed, with Sylvia and Nassau being finished as survey vessels. Tartarus was broken up on the slipway in 1865, having cost £6,268 and work to Pegasus cost only £339. Guernsey was never laid down.

== Ships ==
Name	Ship Builder	Launched	Fate
Cormorant	Money Wigram & Sons, Blackwall Yard	9 February 1860	Sold on 7 June 1870 at Hong Kong
Racehorse	Money Wigram & Sons, Blackwall Yard	19 March 1860	Wrecked near Chefoo, China, on 4 November 1864
Serpent	C J Mare & Company, Leamouth	23 June 1860	Sold to Castle for breaking at Charlton on 13 April 1875
Star	C J Mare & Company, Leamouth	15 December 1860	Completed breaking at Plymouth on 14 March 1877
Eclipse	J Scott Russell, Millwall	18 September 1860	Broken up at Sheerness in July 1867
Lily	J Scott Russell, Millwall	27 February 1861	Broken up at Sheerness in October 1867
Sylvia	Woolwich Dockyard	20 March 1866	Survey ship in October 1866. Sold to George Cohen for breaking in August 1889
Nassau	Pembroke Dockyard	20 February 1866	Survey ship in July 1866. Broken up at Sheerness April 1880
Myrmidon	Chatham Dockyard	5 June 1867	Survey ship in 1884. Sold at Hong Kong in April 1889
Tartarus	Pembroke Dockyard		Cancelled on 16 December 1864 and broken up on 4 November 1865
Pegasus	Woolwich Dockyard		Cancelled on 12 December 1863
Albatross	Chatham Dockyard		Cancelled on 12 December 1863
Guernsey	Pembroke Dockyard		Cancelled on 12 December 1863 (never laid down)

== References and sources ==
Sources

- Bastock, John (1988), Ships on the Australia Station, Child & Associates Publishing Pty Ltd; Frenchs Forest, Australia. ISBN 0-86777-348-0
- Preston, Antony; Major, John (2007). Send a Gunboat: The Victorian Navy and Supremacy at Sea, 1854–1904 (2nd ed.). London: Conway. ISBN 978-0-85177-923-2.
- Lyon, David & Winfield, Rif (2004). The Sail and Steam Navy List: All the Ships of the Royal Navy 1815–1889. Chatham Publishing. ISBN 978-1-86176-032-6. OCLC 52620555.
