= HMS Leda (1892) =

British torpedo gunboat and minesweeper

History

United Kingdom
- Name: HMS Leda
- Builder: Sheerness Dockyard
- Laid down: 25 June 1891
- Launched: 13 September 1891
- Completed: November 1893
- Fate: Scrapped 1922

General characteristics
- Class & type: Alarm-class torpedo gunboat
- Displacement: 810 long tons (820 t)
- Length: 230 ft 0 in (70.10 m) pp
- Beam: 27 ft 0 in (8.23 m)
- Draught: 8 ft 6 in (2.59 m)
- Installed power: 3,500 ihp (2,600 kW)
- Propulsion: 2× triple expansion steam engines; 2 shafts
- Speed: 18.7 kn (21.5 mph; 34.6 km/h)
- Complement: 91
- Armament: 2 × 4.7 in (120 mm) QF guns; 4 × 3-pounder (47 mm ) guns; 1 × Gardiner machine gun; 5 × 14 inch torpedo tubes

HMS Leda was an Alarm-class torpedo gunboat of the British Royal Navy. She was built by Sheerness Dockyard from 1891 to 1893. She was converted to a minesweeper in 1908–1909 and continued these duties during the First World War. Leda was scrapped in 1922.

== Design and construction ==
Leda was one of 11 Alarm-class torpedo gunboats ordered for the Royal Navy under the 1889 Naval Defence Act, which authorised the shipbuilding programme for the next five years, and also included the last two torpedo gunboats of the Sharpshooter class and the five torpedo-gunboats of the Dryad class. The Alarms were slightly modified versions of the previous Sharpshooter class, with modified engines to improve reliability.

Leda was 230 feet (70.10 m) long between perpendiculars, with a beam of 27 feet (8.23 m) and a draught of 12 feet (3.66 m). Displacement was 810 long tons (820 t). Two triple-expansion steam engines, fed by four locomotive boilers, drove two propeller shafts. The machinery was heavier than that installed in the Sharpshooters, and was slightly downrated (from 3,600 indicated horsepower (2,700 kW) to 3,500 indicated horsepower (2,600 kW)) to improve reliability. This gave a speed of 18.7 knots (34.6 km/h; 21.5 mph).

The ship was armed with two 4.7-inch (120 mm) QF guns mounted fore and aft on the ship's centreline, backed up by four 3-pounder (47 mm) guns (two in single mounts on the ship's beam and two in casemates forward) and a single Gardner machine gun. Five 14-inch torpedo tubes were fitted (one fixed in the ship's bow and two twin mounts), with three reload torpedoes carried. The ship had a crew of 91.

Leda was laid down at Sheerness Dockyard on 25 June 1891 and launched on 13 September 1892. She was completed in November 1893 at a cost of £62,145.

== Service ==
After completion, Leda was assigned to the Medway Fleet Reserve, and was required to be ready to be commissioned on 24 hours notice. On 22 March 1894, Leda was commissioned as a tender to Australia, guardship at Southampton, replacing the second-class gunboat Grappler for coastguard and fishery protection duties. In August 1894 Leda took part in that year's Naval Manoeuvres. On 18 July 1895, Leda arrested the French fishing smack L'Espérance off Dungeness, with the French ship's captain fined £10 and L'Espérance's catch confiscated. In July 1896 Leda again took part in that year's Naval Manoeuvres. On 26 June 1897 Leda was present at the Jubilee Fleet Review at Spithead.

On the night of 8 August 1899, Leda was on patrol off Dungeness to stop illegal fishing by French fishing vessels in British territorial waters when she encountered the French trawler L'Etoile de la Mer fishing within the three-mile limit. Leda signalled for the French trawler to stop, but instead, L'Etoile de la Mer made off under full sail. Leda fired warning shots with blank rounds, and when this failed to cause the trawler to stop, fired live rifle rounds with the intention of damaging the trawler's rigging. This gunfire killed one of L'Etoile de la Mer's crew who was shot in the head. The trawler was then towed to Folkestone by one of Leda's boats. An inquest gave a verdict of accidental death for the French sailor. L'Etoile de la Mer's captain was fined for fishing illegally and resisting capture, and the trawler's fishing gear confiscated and destroyed.

Leda sustained damage off Portland during target practice in March 1900, but was refitted to take part in the 1900 Naval Manoeuvres in July that year, and again took part in the 1901 Manoeuvres, where she was judged by the umpires to have been captured by the opposing force.

By 1905 Leda had her obsolete locomotive boilers replaced by water-tube boilers, greatly increasing the power and reliability of the ship's machinery, which delivered 5,800 indicated horsepower (4,300 kW) during sea trials, giving a speed of 21.8 knots (25.1 mph; 40.4 km/h). Despite these improvements, she was still too slow for effective use against much faster torpedo boats and destroyers, and was employed as a drillship for Royal Navy Reserve training in the Clyde until 1906.

In 1907 Leda was assigned to coast-guard duties. On 8 February 1908, Leda collided with the old cruiser Andromache in Harwich harbour. Leda was badly holed and had to be beached to avoid sinking. She went under repair at Sheerness Dockyard. Repairs were completed by the end of March that year, allowing Leda to resume her coast-guard duties at Harwich. On 16 September 1909, Leda was in collision with the fishing smack Mercia off the entrance to Lowestoft harbour. Mercia's owners took the case of the collision to Admiralty court, hoping to recover the cost of damages to their vessel, but the judge ruled that the collision was solely the fault of a poor course set by the master of Mercia.

She was converted to a minesweeper in 1909, which involved removing the torpedo tubes, but continued on coast-guard and fishery protection operations. On 3 February 1914 Leda was towing the coastguard cutter Snipe off Gunfleet in the Thames estuary when Snipe foundered and sunk. One of Leda's crew drowned when Snipe sank.

On the outbreak of the First World War Leda, reverting to the role of minesweeper, joined the newly established Grand Fleet. In August 1914, the minesweepers attached to the Grand Fleet, including Leda were employed on carrying out daily sweeps of the Pentland Firth.

On 16 October 1914, Leda sighted a suspected periscope inside the fleet anchorage at Scapa Flow in Orkney. On 22 October 1914, as a result of this and other suspected sightings of submarines, the 1st and 4th Battle Squadrons of the Grand Fleet moved to Lough Swilly on the east coast of Northern Ireland, which was considered more secure against submarine attack. On 27 October, the battleship Audacious struck a mine off Tory Island, north-west of Lough Swilly, and despite efforts to tow her to safety, sank later that day. Leda, which along with sister ship Circe was already at Lough Swilly, was used to clear a safe channel through the minefield.

Leda was a member of the Second Fleet Sweeping Flotilla, based at Scapa Flow as part of the Grand Fleet, in July 1917. Leda was sold for scrap on 14 July 1920 to Cardiff Marine Stores. She was broken up in Germany in 1922.

== Pennant numbers ==
Pennant number	From	To
N28	1914	1918
N69	January 1918	-

== Bibliography ==
- Brassey, T. A., ed. (1895). The Naval Annual 1895. Portsmouth, UK: J Griffin and Co.
- Brassey, T. A., ed. (1897). The Naval Annual 1897. Portsmouth, UK: J Griffin and Co.
- Brassey, T. A., ed. (1898). The Naval Annual 1898. Portsmouth, UK: J Griffin and Co.
- Brassey, T. A., ed. (1902). The Naval Annual 1902. Portsmouth, UK: J Griffin and Co.
- Brassey, T. A., ed. (1905). The Naval Annual 1905. Portsmouth, UK: J Griffin and Co.
- Brown, Les (2023). Royal Navy Torpedo Vessels. Barnsley, UK: Seaforth Publishing. ISBN 978-1-3990-2285-9.
- Colledge, J. J.; Warlow, Ben (2006). Ships of the Royal Navy: The Complete Record of all Fighting Ships of the Royal Navy from the 15th Century to the Present. London: Chatham Publishing. ISBN 9781861762818.
- Chesneau, Roger; Kolesnik, Eugene M., eds. (1979). Conway's All the World's Fighting Ships 1860–1905. London: Conway Maritime Press. ISBN 0-85177-133-5.
- Dittmar, F. J.; Colledge, J. J. (1972). British Warships 1914–1919. Shepperton, UK: Ian Allan. ISBN 0-7110-0380-7.
- Friedman, Norman (2009). British Destroyers: From Earliest Days to the Second World War. Barnsley, UK: Seaforth Publishing. ISBN 978-1-84832-049-9.
- Gardiner, Robert; Gray, Randal, eds. (1985). Conway's All The World's Fighting Ships 1906–1921. London: Conway Maritime Press. ISBN 0-85177-245-5.
- Jellicoe, John (1919). The Grand Fleet 1914–1916: Its Creation, Development and Work. London: Cassell & Company.
- Leyland, John, ed. (1901). The Naval Annual 1901. Portsmouth, UK: J Griffin and Co.
- Massie, Robert K. (2007). Castles of Steel: Britain, Germany and the Winning of the Great War at Sea. London: Vintage Books. ISBN 978-0-099-52378-9.
- Monograph No. 23: Home Waters Part I: From the Outbreak of War to 27 August 1914 (PDF). Naval Staff Monographs (Historical). Vol. X. Naval Staff, Training and Staff Duties Division. 1924.
- Monograph No. 24: Home Waters Part II: September and October 1914 (PDF). Naval Staff Monographs (Historical). Vol. XI. Naval Staff, Training and Staff Duties Division. 1924.
- Monograph No. 35: Home Waters Part IX: 1st May 1917 to 31st July 1917 (PDF). Naval Staff Monographs (Historical). Vol. XIX. Naval Staff, Training and Staff Duties Division. 1939.
- Moore, John (1990). Jane's Fighting Ships of World War I. London: Studio Editions. ISBN 1-85170-378-0.
