= Plover-class gunvessel =

Wooden gunboat

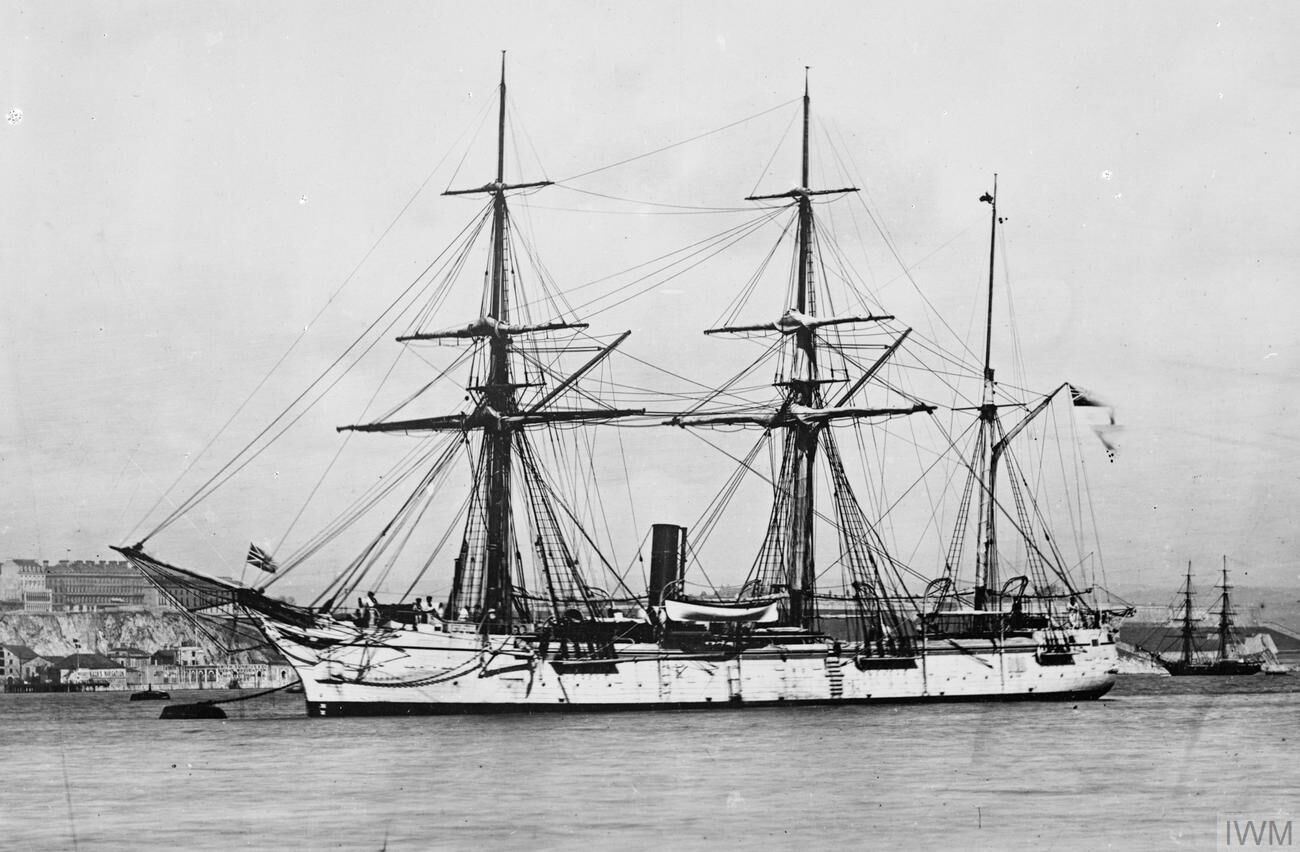
- Woodlark in 1880

Class overview
- Name: Plover class
- Operators: Royal Navy
- Preceded by: Cormorant class
- Succeeded by: Beacon class
- Built: 1867–1871
- Completed: 12
- Scrapped: 12

General characteristics (as built)
- Type: Wooden screw gunvessel
- Displacement: 805 long tons (818 t)
- Tons burthen: 663 bm
- Length: 170 ft (51.8 m) (p/p)
- Beam: 29 ft (8.8 m)
- Draught: 10 ft 6 in (3.2 m)
- Depth: 15 ft (4.6 m)
- Installed power: 857–985 ihp (639–735 kW)
- Propulsion: 2 shafts; 2 × 2-cylinder horizontal steam engines; 4 × boilers
- Sail plan: Barque rig
- Speed: 10–11 knots (19–20 km/h; 12–13 mph)
- Complement: 90
- Armament: 1 × 7-inch rifled muzzle-loading gun; 2 × 40-pounder rifled breechloading guns

The Plover-class gunvessels were a class of wooden gunboats built for the Royal Navy in the late 1860s. They mostly served overseas and were retired early as they were regarded as hopelessly obsolete by the late 1880s.

== Ships ==
Ship	Builder	Laid down	Launched	Completed	Fate
Plover	Deptford Dockyard	NA	20 February 1867	NA	Sold for breaking, August 1885
Ringdove	Portsmouth Dockyard	NA	4 September 1867	NA	Sold for breaking, 17 May 1882
Philomel	Deptford Dockyard	NA	29 October 1867	NA	Sold at Bombay, 14 April 1886
Lapwing	Devonport Dockyard	21 January 1867	8 November 1867	27 June 1868	Sold for breaking, 15 April 1885
Magpie	Portsmouth Dockyard	NA	12 February 1868	NA	Survey vessel in 1878. Sold, September 1885
Bullfinch	Sheerness Dockyard	NA	13 February 1868	NA	Sold for breaking, June 1885
Seagull	Devonport Dockyard	15 April 1867	6 March 1868	19 April 1871	Sold for breaking, November 1887
Curlew	Deptford Dockyard	NA	20 August 1868	NA	Sold for breaking, 7 November 1882
Swallow	Portsmouth Dockyard	NA	16 November 1868	NA	Sold, 18 October 1882
Bittern	Pembroke Dockyard	NA	20 September 1869	NA	Sold for breaking, November 1887
Vulture	Sheerness Dockyard	NA	6 November 1869	NA	Sold for breaking, September 1885
Woodlark	Chatham Dockyard	NA	9 March 1871	NA	Sold at Bombay, 9 March 1887

== Bibliography ==
- Colledge, J. J.; Warlow, Ben (2006) [1969]. Ships of the Royal Navy: The Complete Record of All Fighting Ships of the Royal Navy from the 15th Century to the Present (3rd Rev ed.). London: Chatham Publishing. ISBN 978-1-86176-281-8. OCLC 67375475.
- Ballard, G. A. (1940). "British Gunvessels of 1875: The Larger Twin-Screw Type". Mariner's Mirror. 26 (January). Cambridge, UK: Society for Nautical Research: 15–32. doi:10.1080/00253359.1940.10657367.
- Chesneau, Roger; Kolesnik, Eugene M., eds. (1979). Conway's All the World's Fighting Ships 1860–1905. Greenwich, UK: Conway Maritime Press. ISBN 0-8317-0302-4.
- Lyon, David & Winfield, Rif (2004). The Sail and Steam Navy List: All the Ships of the Royal Navy 1815–1889. Chatham Publishing. ISBN 978-1-86176-032-6. OCLC 52620555.
