= HMS Niger (1892) =

Torpedo gunboat launched in 1892

Coordinates: 51.2206°N 1.4400°E

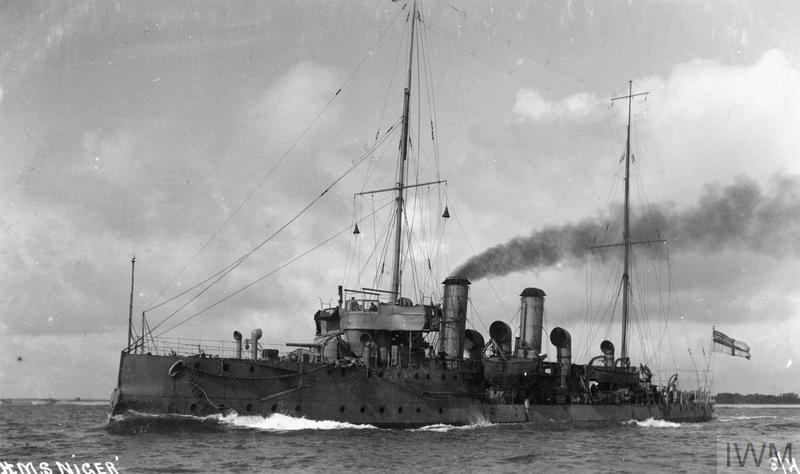
- Niger

History

United Kingdom
- Name: Niger
- Builder: Naval Construction & Armament, Barrow
- Laid down: 17 September 1891
- Launched: 17 December 1892
- Commissioned: 25 April 1893
- Fate: Torpedoed and sunk, 11 November 1914

General characteristics
- Class & type: Alarm-class torpedo gunboat
- Displacement: 810–835 long tons (823–848 t)
- Length: 74 m (242 ft 9 in)
- Beam: 33 m (108 ft 3 in)
- Draught: 8.2 m (26 ft 11 in)
- Propulsion: 2 three-cylinder steam engines
- Speed: 18.7 knots (34.6 km/h; 21.5 mph)
- Complement: 91
- Armament: two fixed and movable 360 mm torpedo tubes; a QF 4.7-inch gun Mk I-IV; a Gardner machine gun

HMS Niger was an Alarm-class torpedo gunboat of the Royal Navy launched in 1892, converted to a minesweeper in 1909, and sunk in 1914 by the German submarine SM U-12 near Deal.

== Early history ==
The ship was ordered from Naval Construction & Armament, Barrow, and laid down on 17 September 1891. She was launched on 17 December 1892 and commissioned on 25 April 1893.

Niger was the training ship for and tender to HMS Vernon, torpedo school ship at Portsmouth.

In 1902 she had a major refit at the Palmers Shipbuilding Company, where she was fitted with new and larger engines, and with Reed water tube boilers. On her completion in February 1903 she was placed in the A division of the Medway Fleet reserve, before she relieved HMS Jaseur as tender to Vernon, taking the crew of the former ship, under the command of Lieutenant Robert Warren Johnson.

== Sinking of HMS Niger ==
On the morning of 11 November a U-boat attack occurred off Deal. Around noon there was an explosion and black smoke rose from HMS Niger. Niger was at anchor about two miles (3.2 km) off the pier at Deal when she was torpedoed and sunk before noon on 11 November 1914 by the German submarine SM U-12. Niger was the first ship sunk by U-boat commander Walther Forstmann. Forstmann was one of the most successful commanders of the Imperial German Navy in the First World War. She was also the first Allied ship to be sunk by German submarines based at the newly captured Belgian naval bases.

Many who were tracking the fighting from onshore saw the explosion and the smoke. Even though there were high winds and huge waves, boats went to the sinking ship and were able to take the crew off. Some of Niger's sailors were eating lunch when the torpedo hit and so were only lightly dressed. All officers, but only 77 men of Niger's crew survived the sinking, four people were injured. Lieutenant-Commander Arthur Thomas Muir, who commanded the ship remained on the bridge until the rest of the crew had left. He suffered serious injuries in the explosion. The injured were taken to the nearby Royal Naval Hospital.

When HMS Niger was attacked there were about 100 other ships nearby. One of these had a Dutch flag and was moored very close to Niger and then suspiciously disappeared after the attack. The British Admiralty suspected it to be a German spy ship.

The commander of the naval squadron, that HMS Niger was a member of, was Geoffrey Spicer-Simson who would later become famous for commanding a small flotilla which defeated a superior German force during the Battle for Lake Tanganyika. At the time of the sinking of Niger, Spicer-Simson was visiting his wife and some of her lady friends at a nearby hotel.
