= Britomart-class gunboat =

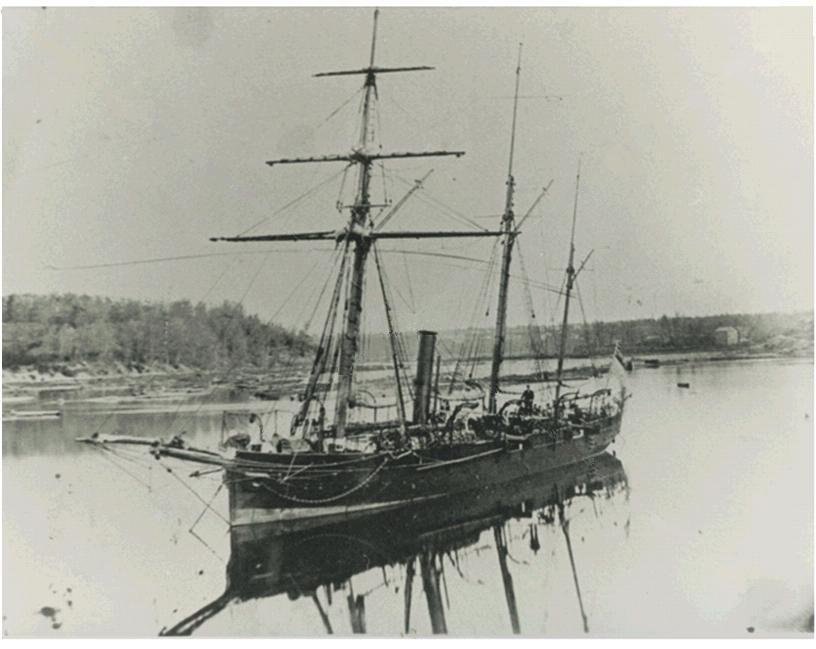
- HMS Cherub Goderich, Lake Huron in 1866

Class overview
- Name: Britomart class
- Operators: Royal Navy
- Preceded by: Algerine class
- Succeeded by: Ariel class
- Built: 1859–1867
- In commission: 1860–1890
- Planned: 20
- Completed: 16
- Canceled: 4

General characteristics
- Type: 'Crimean' gunboat
- Displacement: 330 tons
- Tons burthen: 267 82/94 bm
- Length: 120 ft 0 in (36.6 m) (gundeck); 105 ft 7 in (32.18 m) (keel)
- Beam: 22 ft 0 in (6.7 m)
- Depth of hold: 9 ft 0 in (2.7 m)
- Installed power: 60 nhp; 157–277 ihp (117–207 kW))
- Propulsion: 1 × 1-cylinder single-expansion reciprocating steam engine; 1 × screw
- Speed: 9 kn (17 km/h)
- Crew: 36–40
- Armament: 2 × 68-pounder SBML gun; or; 2 × 64-pounder RML gun

The Britomart-class gunboat was a class of sixteen gunboats built for the Royal Navy in 1859–1867.

== Design ==
The Britomart class was an improved version of the Dapper class designed by W.H. Walker, and as such comes under the generic group "Crimean gunboats" although this class was ordered and built long after the end of the Crimean War. These were the last Royal Navy gunboats to have wooden hulls: subsequent gunboats were of composite construction, with wooden planking over iron frames.

=== Propulsion ===
The class were fitted with a single-cylinder single-expansion reciprocating steam engine. The single screw could be hoisted to give improved performance under sail.

=== Sail plan ===
The ships were provided with a three-masted barquentine rig, that is, with square sails on the foremast and fore-and-aft sails on the main and mizzen masts.

=== Armament ===
Early ships of the class were armed with two 68-pounder smooth bore muzzle loading cannon (as had been planned, but not implemented, for the Dapper class); but the Heron was fitted with two 112-pounder Armstrong guns. Later ships had two 64-pounder rifled muzzle-loading guns.

== Ships ==
Name	Ship builder	Launched	Engine builder	Fate
Britomart	T & W Smith, North Shields	7 May 1860	John Penn and Sons	Served on Lake Erie. Sold to Henry Castle & Sons on 12 January 1892, and resold to S Williams of Dagenham as a mooring hulk. Broken up in June 1946
Cockatrice	T & W Smith, North Shields	24 May 1860	John Penn and Sons	Became luggage lighter YC.10 at Malta in 1882. Sold there in 1885
Wizard	T & W Smith, North Shields	3 August 1860	John Penn and Sons	Broken up at Malta in September 1878
Speedy	C Lamport, Workington	18 July 1860	installed at Plymouth Dockyard	Sold to Henry Castle & Sons for breaking at Charlton in August 1889
Doterel	Wm. Cowley Miller, Toxteth Dock, Liverpool	5 July 1860	Miller, Ravenhill & Co	Sold to Marshall, Plymouth on 6 June 1871
Heron	Wm. Cowley Miller, Toxteth Dock, Liverpool	5 July 1860	Miller, Ravenhill & Co	Served on Lake Ontario. Sold in Jamaica in June 1879 and broken up there in 1881
Pigeon	Briggs & Co., Sunderland	7 June 1860	Maudslay, Sons and Field	Broken up at Devonport on 29 September 1876
Linnet	Briggs & Co., Sunderland	7 June 1860	Maudslay, Sons and Field	Breaking completed at Chatham on 15 July 1872
Tyrian	Courtenay, Newhaven	7 September 1861	installed at Portsmouth Dockyard	Tug in 1883 at Jamaica and sold there in 1891
Trinculo	Joseph Banks, Plymouth	15 September 1860	installed at Plymouth Dockyard	Wrecked after collision with SS Moratin off Gibraltar on 5 September 1870
Cherub	Portsmouth Dockyard	29 March 1865		Served on Lake Huron. Sold to Castle for breaking at Charlton 5 May 1890
Netley	Portsmouth Dockyard	22 July 1866		Sold at Portsmouth to Castle for breaking at Charlton in September 1885
Minstrel	Portsmouth Dockyard	16 February 1865		Coal hulk at Bermuda in 1874 and sold in 1903
Orwell	Portsmouth Dockyard	27 December 1866		Sold to the Customs Board on 20 December 1890
Cromer	Portsmouth Dockyard	20 November 1867		Sold on 24 August 1886 for breaking
Bruiser (or Bruizer)	Portsmouth Dockyard	23 April 1867		Broken up at Devonport in May 1886
Bramble	Portsmouth Dockyard			Cancelled 12 December 1863
Crown	Portsmouth Dockyard			Cancelled 12 December 1863
Protector	Portsmouth Dockyard			Cancelled 12 December 1863
Danube	Portsmouth Dockyard			Cancelled 12 December 1863 (never started)
