= Gardner gun =

Machine gun

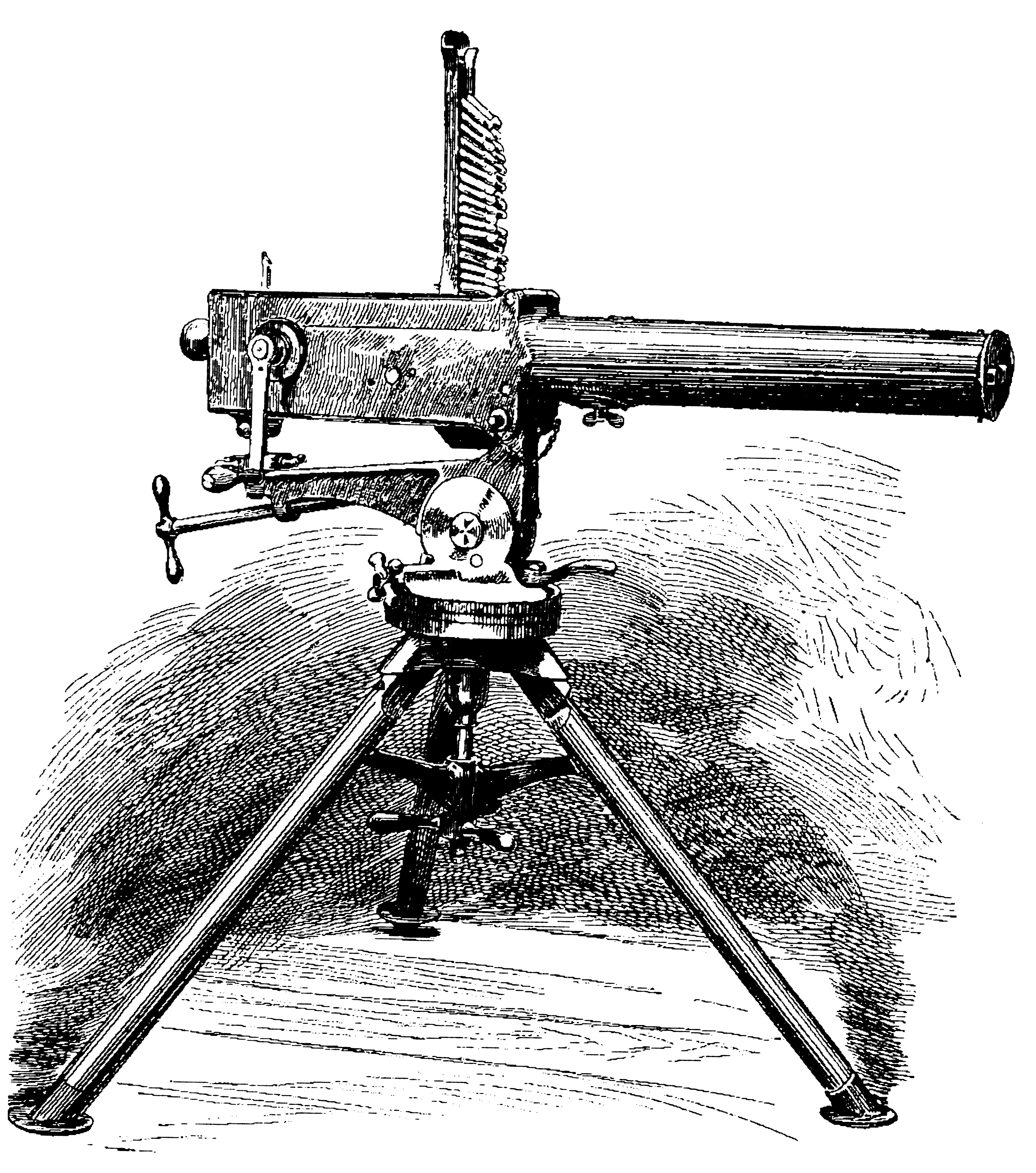
Lithograph of Gardner Gun

The Gardner gun was an early type of mechanical machine gun. The original version had two barrels but it was also built with five barrels or a single barrel. It was hand-cranked and was fed from a vertical hopper magazine. When the crank was turned, a feed arm positioned a cartridge in the breech, the bolt closed and the weapon fired. Turning the crank further opened the breechblock and extracted the spent case.

== Development ==
The Gardner machine gun was invented in 1874 by William Gardner of Toledo, Ohio, formerly a captain in the Union Army during the American Civil War. After producing a prototype he went to the Pratt and Whitney company, who after a year of development produced a military version of the weapon.

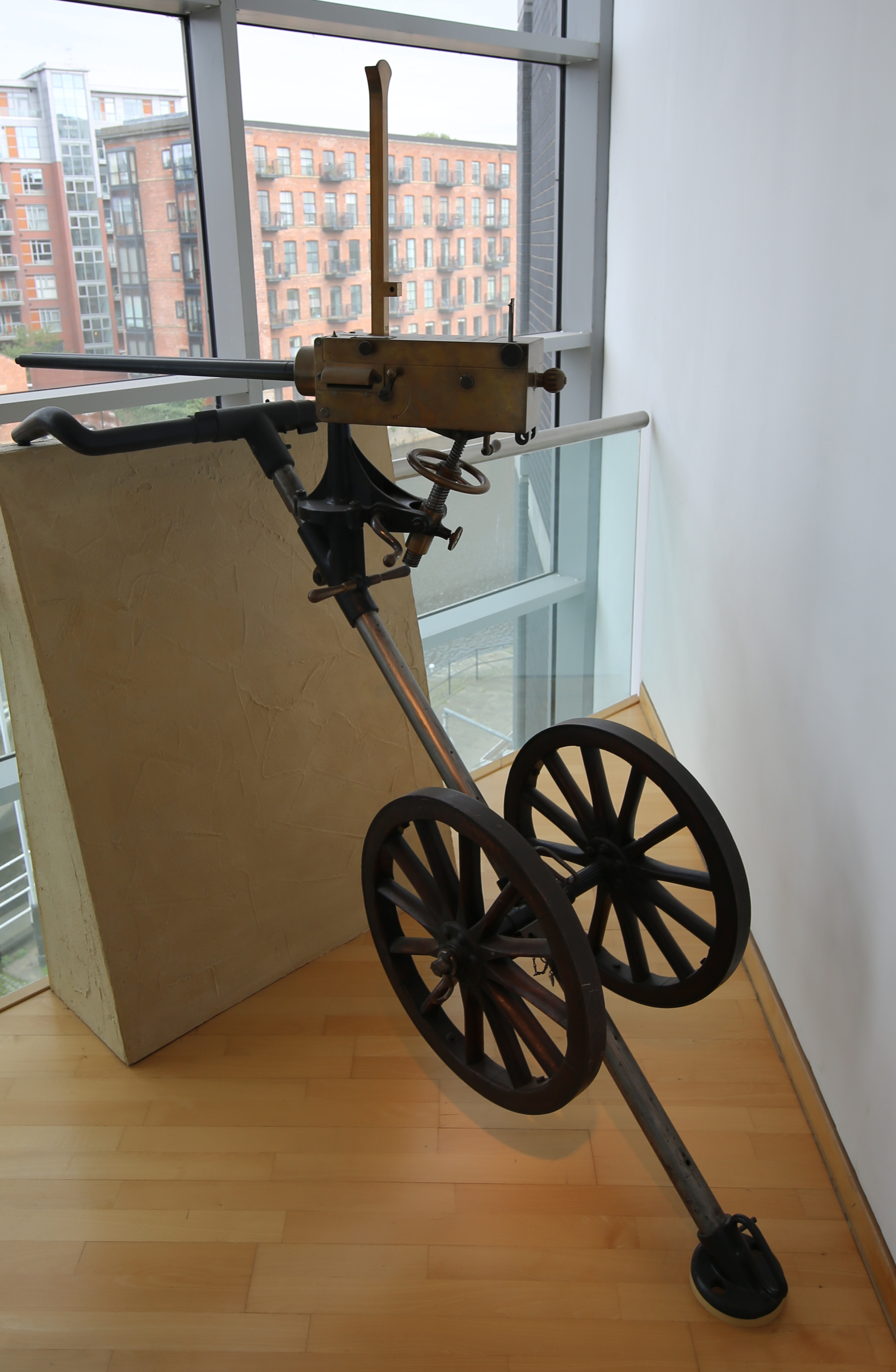
An 1887 Gardner machine gun

The mechanism was operated by a horizontal axis hand crank at the rear of the breech. This worked the breechblock(s) back and forth by a desmodromic cam mechanism. To even out the forces, the first version used two barrels, side-by-side, and worked by separate cams on the same crank. The cams were of large enough diameter to also act as the lock for the breechblock. A striker inside each breechblock was cocked against a coil spring, then once the breech was closed the cam tripped a sear lever and fired the striker into the primer. A rack gear and sector on the moving breechblock worked the cartridge feed.

To provide a higher rate of fire, a five-barrel version was constructed. This fired faster, but still left time between rounds to allow each barrel to cool down a little. A single-barrel version was also produced.

A demonstration to officers at the Washington Navy Yard in Washington, D.C., in 1875 was successful, but they recommended that Pratt and Whitney continue with development of the system, incorporating improvements to the feed system, which were designed by E. G. Parkhurst, an engineer at Pratt and Whitney. The United States Army attended the tests, but showed no interest in the weapon.

Parkhurst added many improvements to the gun's firing mechanism which made it more reliable. During 1877 additional tests took place with a .45 calibre (11.4 mm) version of the weapon, which determined its muzzle velocity to be 1,280 feet per second (390 m/s).

On 17 June 1879 a further demonstration was carried out at the Navy Yard, during which the weapon was presented by Francis A. Pratt and Amos Whitney. The weapon fired a total of 10,000 rounds during the test, taking a total elapsed time of 27 minutes 36 seconds, with breaks between firing to resolve an issue with one of the extractors. While the test was not without issues the weapon managed to fire 4,722 rounds before the first stoppage, (Note: An initial warm-up burst of 200, followed by 1,000 rounds, followed by 431 rounds, followed by 3,071 rounds.) and after the stoppage was resolved it fired approximately 5,000 rounds without incident.

On 15 January and 17 March 1880 duplicate tests were conducted at Sandy Hook proving ground in front of an Army review board. The weapon performed well, and they recommended that the Army buy a limited number for field evaluation, noting the low cost of the weapon. However the Army declined to purchase.

At this point, the British Royal Navy, which had successfully deployed the Gatling gun, became interested in the weapon, and Gardner was invited to England to exhibit his invention. The Admiralty were so impressed by the demonstrations that they adopted the weapon and purchased the rights to produce it in England. Gardner remained in England to supervise the construction of the weapons.

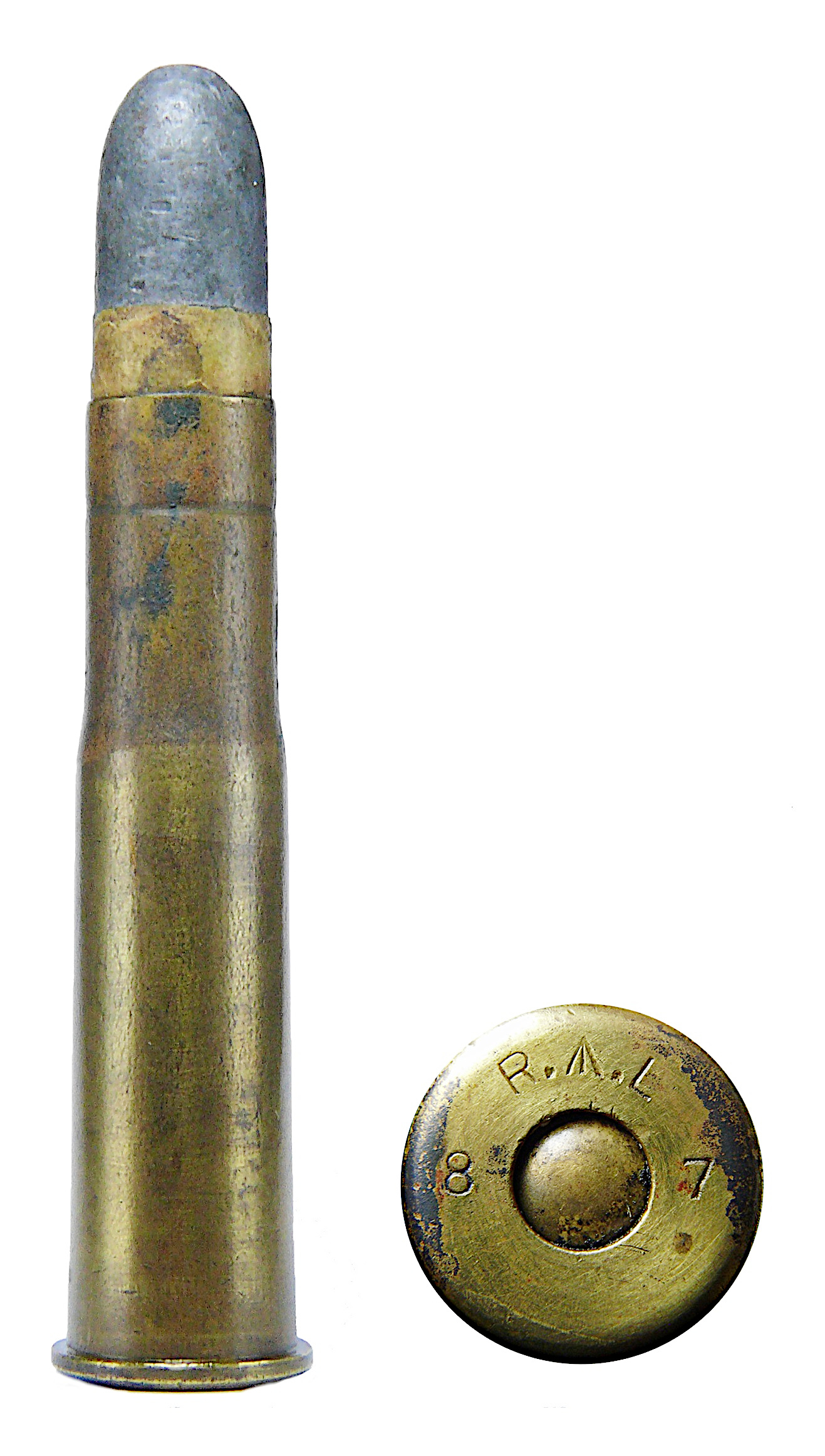
.45″ Cartridge Machine Gun Ball Mk III

The British Army then took an interest in machine guns and after a series of trials selected the Gardner gun. During these tests a five-barrelled Gardner gun fired 16,754 rounds before a failure occurred, with only 24 stoppages. When operator-induced errors were taken into account, there were only four malfunctions in 10,000 rounds fired. The Army adopted the weapon, although its introduction was delayed because of opposition from the Royal Artillery. It saw action in the Mahdist War (in Sudan), notably at the Battle of Abu Klea, where its mechanism proved vulnerable to desert sand and dust blowing about.

There was also the .577/450 Martini–Henry calibre Bira gun, based upon the Gardner gun but with dual barrels, an overhead drum magazine, and designed in Nepal.

It is noted that the Bira was only ever produced in very small numbers. These are extremely rare and an example of Victorian firepower. An American company, International Military Antiques, found a limited number in the Old Palace of Lagan Silekhana in Kathmandu, Nepal, which were included with the purchase of over 50,000 antique firearms from the Royal Nepalese Army in 2003. There is controversy, as the arms cache had to tranship through India and questions remain as to the purchase.

== Users ==
- Argentina
- Austrian Empire
- Bolivia
- British Empire
- Chile
- Denmark
- Kingdom of Italy
- Netherlands
- Peru
- Qing Empire
- United States

== Conflicts ==
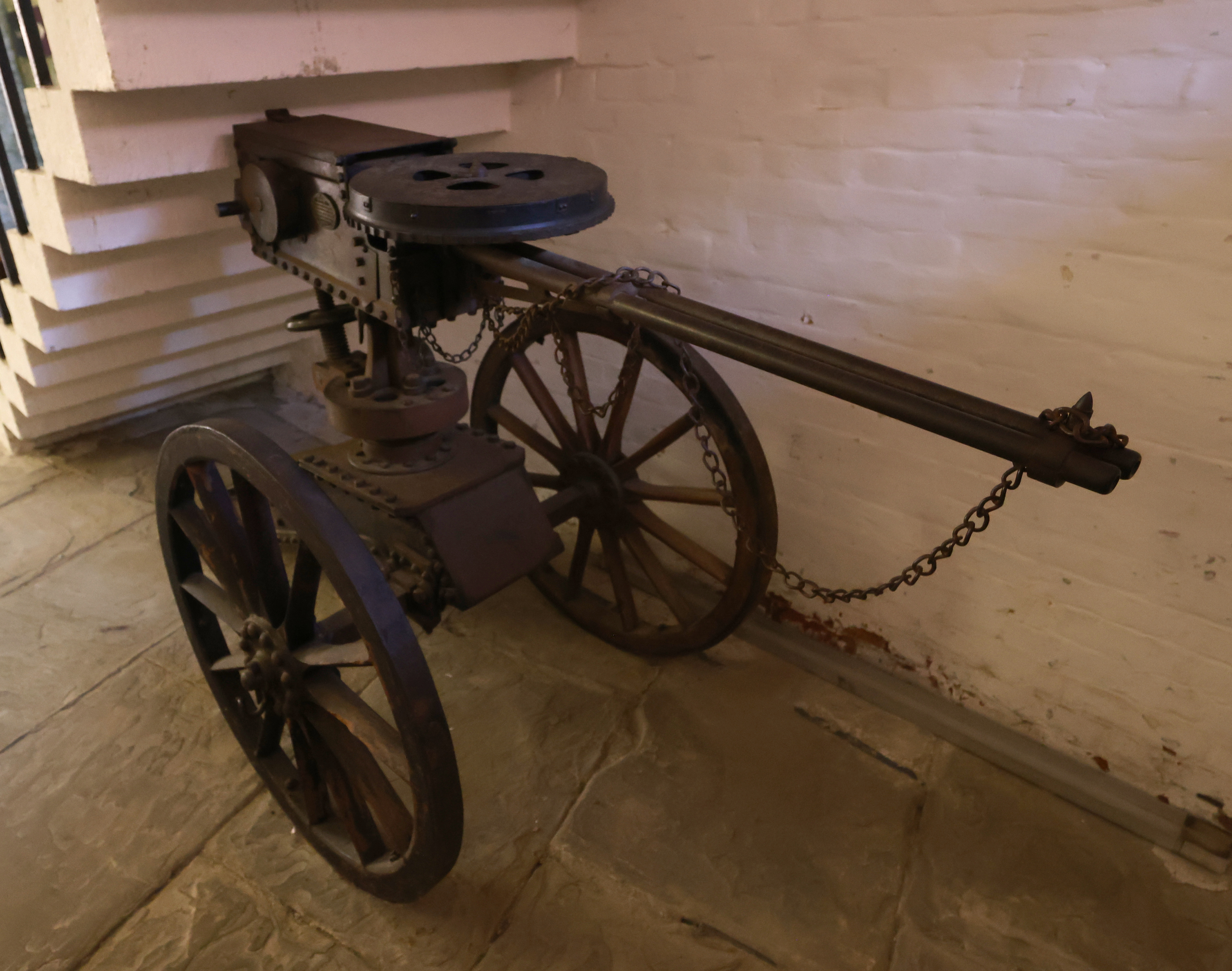
A Bira gun

- War of The Pacific
- Mahdist War
- First Matabele War
- First Sino-Japanese War
- World War I

== See also ==
=== Weapons of comparable role, performance and era ===
- Nordenfelt gun: similar hand-cranked machine gun
