= HMS Seagull (1889) =

Torpedo gunboat of the British Royal Navy

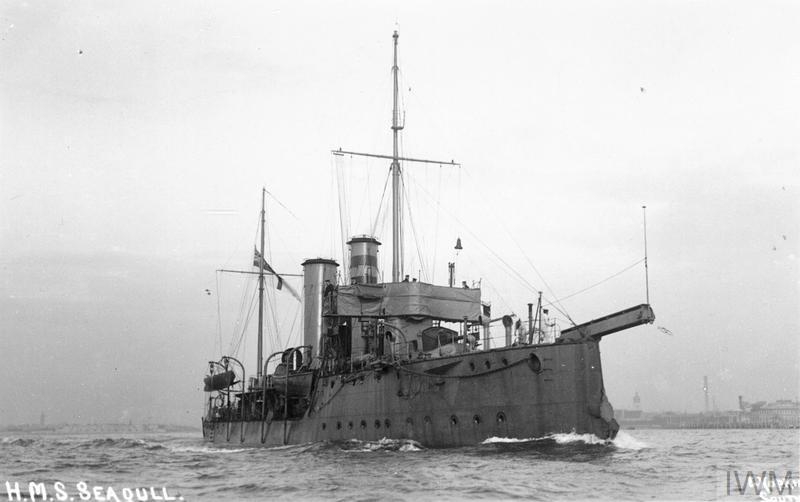
- Torpedo gunboat HMS Seagull

History

United Kingdom
- Name: HMS Seagull
- Builder: Chatham Dockyard
- Laid down: 23 April 1888
- Launched: 31 May1889
- Completed: January 1891
- Fate: Sunk 1918

General characteristics
- Class & type: Sharpshooter-class torpedo gunboat
- Displacement: 735 long tons (747 t)
- Length: 230 ft 0 in (70.10 m) pp
- Beam: 27 ft 0 in (8.23 m)
- Draught: 10 ft 6 in (3.20 m)
- Installed power: 3,600 ihp (2,700 kW)
- Propulsion: 2× triple expansion steam engines; 2 shafts
- Speed: 19 kn (22 mph; 35 km/h)
- Complement: 91
- Armament: 2 × 4.7 in (120 mm) QF guns; 4 × 3-pounder (47 mm ) guns; 5 × 14 inch torpedo tubes

HMS Seagull was a Sharpshooter-class torpedo gunboat of the British Royal Navy. She was built at Chatham Dockyard from 1888–1891. She was converted to a minesweeper in 1908–1909 and continued these duties during the First World War. Seagull was sunk in a collision with a merchant ship on 30 September 1918.

== Design and construction ==
The Sharpshooter-class was designed under the leadership of William Henry White, the Director of Naval Construction to be faster and more seaworthy than the preceding prototype torpedo gunboat, Rattlesnake and the three Grasshopper-class torpedo gunboats, while carrying a heavier armament. As torpedo gunboats, they were intended to defend the fleet from attack by torpedo boats, while being capable of carrying out torpedo attacks themselves.

The Sharpshooters were larger than the preceding ships, with a raised forecastle to improve seakeeping. They were 242 feet 0 inches (73.76 m) long overall and 230 feet (70 m) between perpendiculars, with a beam of 27 feet 0 inches (8.23 m) and a draught of 10 feet 7 inches (3.23 m). Displacement was 735 long tons (747 t). (Note: While most sources list displacement as 735 long tons (747 t), Friedman gives a displacement of 828 long tons (841 t) normal and 1,070 long tons (1,090 t) full load.) Two triple-expansion steam engines, fed by four locomotive boilers, drove two propeller shafts. The machinery was intended to produce 4,500 indicated horsepower (3,400 kW) giving a speed of 21–22 knots (24–25 mph; 39–41 km/h). The use of locomotive boilers was not a success, with the machinery being unreliable and unable to provide the expected power. The machinery actually delivered 3,600 indicated horsepower (2,700 kW) giving a speed of 18.7 knots (21.5 mph; 34.6 km/h) when forced and 2,500 indicated horsepower (1,900 kW) giving 16.5 knots (19.0 mph; 30.6 km/h) under natural draught.

The ship was armed with two 4.7 inch (120 mm) QF guns mounted fore and aft on the ships centreline, backed up by four 3-pounder (47 mm) guns (two in single mounts on the ship's beam and two in casemates forward). Five 14-inch torpedo tubes were fitted (one fixed in the ship's bow and two twin mounts), with three reload torpedoes carried. The ship had a crew of 91.

Seagull was laid down at Chatham Dockyard on 23 April 1888 and launched on 30 November 1889. She was completed in January 1891 at a cost of £56,922.

== Service ==
In August 1894 Seagull took part in that year's Naval Manoeuvres, and in July 1896 again took part in the Manoeuvres. Seagull was subject to a major refit in 1897–1898, being fitted with Niclausse water-tube boilers in place of the ship's locomotive boilers. Seagull took part in an extensive series of successful trials to evaluate the new boilers, which resulted in further use of the Niclausse boiler by the Royal Navy.

Seagull was a tender at Portsmouth in 1906, and remained on that duty until 1908. In 1909 she was converted to a minesweeper, which involved removing the torpedo tubes.

On the outbreak of the First World War Seagull joined the newly established Grand Fleet. In August 1914, the minesweepers attached to the Grand Fleet, including Seagull were employed on carrying out daily sweeps of the Pentland Firth. In September 1914 Seagull was deployed to guard the Fleet anchorage at Loch Ewe. On 27 October, the battleship Audacious struck a mine off Tory Island, north-west of Lough Swilly, and despite efforts to tow her to safety, sank later that day. As a result, Seagull together with sister ships Skipjack and Speedwell were ordered from Scapa Flow to join Leda and Circe in clearing this minefield.

The old torpedo gunboats such as Seagull were not well suited to continual use in the rough waters around Scapa Flow, and in July 1915 Seagull and sister ship Spanker were deployed to Harwich to sweep ahead of the Harwich Force when it went to sea.

On 15 February 1917 Seagull was east of Aldeburgh when a periscope, probably of the German submarine UC-1, was spotted. Seagull dropped two depth charges on the wake of the periscope.

On 30 September 1918 Seagull was sunk in a collision with the merchant ship SS Corribb in the Firth of Clyde.

== Pennant numbers ==
Pennant number	From	To
C85	1914	January 1918
C81	January 1918	September 1918
C82	September 1918	-

== Bibliography ==
- Brassey, T. A., ed. (1895). The Naval Annual 1895. Portsmouth, UK: J Griffin and Co.
- Brassey, T. A., ed. (1897). The Naval Annual 1897. Portsmouth, UK: J Griffin and Co.
- Brassey, T. A., ed. (1898). The Naval Annual 1898. Portsmouth, UK: J Griffin and Co.
- Brown, D. K. (2003). Warrior to Dreadnought: Warship Development 1860–1905. London: Chatham Publishing. ISBN 1-84067-5292.
- Brown, Les (2023). Royal Navy Torpedo Vessels. Barnsley, UK: Seaforth Publishing. ISBN 978-1-3990-2285-9.
- Chesneau, Roger; Kolesnik, Eugene M., eds. (1979). Conway's All the World's Fighting Ships 1860–1905. London: Conway Maritime Press. ISBN 0-85177-133-5.
- Dittmar, F. J.; Colledge, J. J. (1972). British Warships 1914–1919. Shepperton, UK: Ian Allan. ISBN 0-7110-0380-7.
- Friedman, Norman (2009). British Destroyers: From Earliest Days to the Second World War. Barnsley, UK: Seaforth Publishing. ISBN 978-1-84832-049-9.
- Gardiner, Robert; Gray, Randal, eds. (1985). Conway's All The World's Fighting Ships 1906–1921. London: Conway Maritime Press. ISBN 0-85177-245-5.
- Jane, Fred T., ed. (1970) [Originally published 1906 by Sampson Low Marston: London]. Jane's Fighting Ships 1906/7. Newton Abbot, UK: David & Charles (Publishers). ISBN 0-7153-4715-2.
- Jellicoe, John (1919). The Grand Fleet 1914–1916: Its Creation, Development and Work. London: Cassell & Company.
- Leyland, John, ed. (1901). The Naval Annual 1901. Portsmouth, UK: J Griffin and Co.
- Massie, Robert K. (2007). Castles of Steel: Britain, Germany and the Winning of the Great War at Sea. London: Vintage Books. ISBN 978-0-099-52378-9.
- Monograph No. 23: Home Waters Part I: From the Outbreak of War to 27 August 1914 (PDF). Naval Staff Monographs (Historical). Vol. X. Naval Staff, Training and Staff Duties Division. 1924.
- Monograph No. 24: Home Waters Part II: September and October 1914 (PDF). Naval Staff Monographs (Historical). Vol. XI. Naval Staff, Training and Staff Duties Division. 1924.
- Monograph No. 30: Home Waters Part V: From July to October 1915 (PDF). Naval Staff Monographs (Historical). Vol. XIV. Naval Staff, Training and Staff Duties Division. 1926.
- Monograph No. 34: Home Waters Part VIII: December 1916 to April 1917 (PDF). Naval Staff Monographs (Historical). Vol. XVIII. Naval Staff, Training and Staff Duties Division. 1933.
- Moore, John (1990). Jane's Fighting Ships of World War I. London: Studio Editions. ISBN 1-85170-378-0.
