= List of shipwrecks in August 1890 =

The list of shipwrecks in August 1890 includes ships sunk, foundered, grounded, or otherwise lost during August 1890.

== 1 August ==
List of shipwrecks: 1 August 1890
| Ship | State | Description |
|---|---|---|
| Adion | Sweden | The ship ran aground in the River Parrett. She was on a voyage from Skönvik to Bridgwater, Somerset, United Kingdom. She was refloated and taken in to Bridgwater. |
| Antonio | Romania | The lighter ran aground in the Danube near Sistow and was damaged. |
| Charger | United States | The schooner collided with the steamship City of Cleveland (United States) and sank. |
| Charlton | United Kingdom | The steamship collided with the steamship Isle of Anglesea (United Kingdom) off Cape Finisterre, Spain was severely damaged. She completed her voyage from Novorossiysk, Russia to Fleetwood, Lancashire. |
| Euricos | Romania | The lighter ran aground in the Danube near Sistow and was damaged. |
| Howard | United Kingdom | The ketch was driven ashore at Whitburn, County Durham. She was on a voyage from Montrose, Forfarshire to Sunderland, County Durham. She was refloated the next day and taken in to Sunderland in a leaky condition. |
| Marie Antoinette | United Kingdom | The ship ran aground on the English Bank, in the River Plate. She was on a voyage from Cardiff, Glamorgan to Montevideo, Uruguay |
| Queen | United Kingdom | The schooner was driven ashore at Kingsdown, Kent. She was refloated with assistance. |
| Trinidad | United Kingdom | The steamship was driven ashore on Ischia, Italy. She was refloated. |

== 2 August ==
List of shipwrecks: 2 August 1890
| Ship | State | Description |
|---|---|---|
| Harbinger | United Kingdom | The steamship was severely damaged by fire at South Shields, County Durham. |
| Helene | Germany | The schooner was driven ashore and wrecked near Lemvig, Denmark. She was on a voyage from Hamburg to Limhamn, Sweden. |

== 3 August ==
List of shipwrecks: 3 August 1890
| Ship | State | Description |
|---|---|---|
| Huntleys | United Kingdom | The brigantine was driven ashore on the Pennington Spit, Hampshire. She was refloated and taken in to Lymington. |

== 4 August ==
List of shipwrecks: 4 August 1890
| Ship | State | Description |
|---|---|---|
| Bosforo | Italy | The steamship collided with the steamship Vittoria (Italy) at Genoa and was beached. Bosforo was on a voyage from Genoa to Marseille, Bouches-du-Rhône, France. |
| City of Rio de Janeiro | United Kingdom | The steamship collided with the steamship Bombay (United Kingdom) at Bombay, India and was severely damaged. |
| Shalimar | United Kingdom | The barque was abandoned south of Tierra del Fuego, Chile. She was on a voyage from Liverpool, Lancashire to Pisagua, Chile. |

== 5 August ==
List of shipwrecks: 5 August 1890
| Ship | State | Description |
|---|---|---|
| Tönsberg | Norway | The steamship ran aground "on Stubben". She was on a voyage from Skellefteå, Sweden to Barcelona, Spain. |

== 6 August ==
List of shipwrecks: 6 August 1890
| Ship | State | Description |
|---|---|---|
| Carlisle | United Kingdom | The full-rigged ship was wrecked in the Bass Strait. Her crew were rescued. She was on a voyage from Melbourne, Victoria to Newcastle, New South Wales. |
| Fri | Norway | The schooner was wrecked at Juan de Nova Island, Mozambique. Her nine crew were rescued. She was on a voyage from Port Natal, Natal Colony to Zanzibar. |
| Takano | Flag unknown | The steamship was driven ashore on the Baltic coast of Russia. |

== 7 August ==
List of shipwrecks: 7 August 1890
| Ship | State | Description |
|---|---|---|
| Marion | United States | The schooner was wrecked at Esprit Island. |
| Volga | United Kingdom | The full-rigged ship was wrecked on a reef off Double Island, in the Torres Straits. She was on a voyage from Newcastle, New South Wales to Negapatam, India. |

== 8 August ==
List of shipwrecks: 8 August 1890
| Ship | State | Description |
|---|---|---|
| Admiral Tromp | Norway | The barque was run down and sunk by steamship Ching Wo (United Kingdom) in the Thames Estuary off The Nore. Her crew were rescued. Admiral Tromp was on a voyage from London, United Kingdom to Sundsvall. The wreck was dispersed by explosives April–July 1931. |
| Ane Johane | Denmark | The brigantine was abandoned off Anholt. |
| Bellarena | United Kingdom | The steamship ran aground on the Neckmann Ground, in the Baltic Sea. She was refloated with assistance and taken in to Reval, Russia in a severely damaged condition. |
| Eastern Chief | United Kingdom | The barque was wrecked on the Ortez Bank, in the River Plate. Her crew were rescued. She was on a voyage from Rosario, Argentina to Falmouth, Cornwall. She was later refloated and towed in to Montevideo. |
| Ida | United Kingdom | The barquentine was wrecked on The Smalls. Her crew were rescued by Lady Nearn (United Kingdom). Ida was on a voyage from Ghent, East Flanders, Belgium to Liverpool, Lancashire. |

== 9 August ==
List of shipwrecks: 9 August 1890
| Ship | State | Description |
|---|---|---|
| Bellarena | United Kingdom | The steamship was driven ashore at Hiiumaa, Russia. She was later refloated and taken in to Reval, Russia in a severely damaged condition. She departed under tow for Stockholm, Sweden on 20 August. |
| Gustav Nermann, and Mudir | Sweden | The steamships collided. Gustav Nermann sank. Her crew were rescued. Mudir put in to Falsterbo in a severely damaged condition. |
| Lennox | United Kingdom | The schooner ran aground on Saltholmen, Denmark. She was on a voyage from Cronstadt, Russia to Hartlepool, County Durham. |
| Lilian | Norway | The brig ran aground on the Middelgrund. |

== 10 August ==
List of shipwrecks: 10 August 1890
| Ship | State | Description |
|---|---|---|
| Collivand | United Kingdom | The steamship ran aground 22 nautical miles (41 km) from the mouth of the Danube. |
| Peter | United Kingdom | The smack was driven ashore at Dungeness, Kent. She was on a voyage from Dover, Kent to Rye, Sussex. |
| Transit | Western Australia | The lighter was driven ashore at Fremantle. |
| Zenobia | United Kingdom | The steam yacht collided with the steamship St. Mawes Castle (United Kingdom) at Falmouth, Cornwall and was severely damaged. |

== 11 August ==
List of shipwrecks: 11 August 1890
| Ship | State | Description |
|---|---|---|
| Camperdown | United Kingdom | The clipper departed from Simon's Town, Cape Colony for Newcastle, New South Wales. No further trace, reported overdue, feared to have foundered with the loss of all 31 people on board. |
| Francis Thorpe | United Kingdom | The barque was wrecked at Tehuantepec, Mexico. Her eighteen crew were rescued. She was on a voyage from Montevideo, Uruguay to Tehuantepec. |
| Halcyon, and Rhenbina | United Kingdom | The steamships collided. Halcyon sank with the loss of thirteen of the 24 people on board. She was on a voyage from Ergasteria, Ottoman Empire to Newport, Monmouthshire. Rhenbina was on a voyage from Newport to Lisbon, Portugal. She put in to Vigo, Spain in a severely damaged condition. |
| Jernbarden | Norway | The steamship ran aground in the Seine. She was on a voyage from Rouen, Seine-Inférieure, France to Alicante, Spain. She was refloated. |
| Virgilia | Germany | The steamship was last sighted on this date off Punta Arenas, Chile. No further trace, reported missing. |

== 12 August ==
List of shipwrecks: 12 August 1890
| Ship | State | Description |
|---|---|---|
| Flying Dart | United Kingdom | The paddle tug collided with the steamship North Wall (United Kingdom) and sank in the Irish Sea off the Baily Lighthouse, County Dublin. Her six crew were rescued by North Wall. |
| Gunhild | Sweden | The brig was driven ashore on Skagen, Denmark. She was on a voyage from Åhus to Sunderland, County Durham, United Kingdom. She was refloated and resumed her voyage. |
| Joseph P. Machecca | United States | The schooner was wrecked on the Glover Reef, off Belize City, British Honduras. She was on a voyage from Belize City to Ruatan, Honduras. |
| Tagus | United Kingdom | The steamship was driven ashore at Spittal Point' Northumberland. She was on a voyage from Bo'ness, Lothian to Berwick upon Tweed, Northumberland. She was refloated the next day. |

== 13 August ==
List of shipwrecks: 13 August 1890
| Ship | State | Description |
|---|---|---|
| Anna | Norway | The barque was driven ashore at Portaferry, County Down, United Kingdom. She was on a voyage from Greenock, Renfrewshire, United Kingdom to Quebec, Dominion of Canada. |
| Asta | Denmark | The schooner was driven ashore at "Kapplevik", Iceland. Her crew survived. |
| North Star | United Kingdom | The fishing trawler collided with HMS Ruby (Royal Navy) east of the Bell Rock and was severely damaged. She put in to Leith, Lothian. |
| Professor | United Kingdom | The steamship was driven ashore at Firefly Light, Mexico. She was on a voyage from Liverpool, Lancashire to New Orleans, Louisiana, United States. She was refloated. |
| Token | United Kingdom | The schooner sprang a leak and foundered in the Irish Sea 20 nautical miles (37 km) south south east of the Isle of Man. Her crew were rescued by Clara Felicia (Flag unknown). Token was on a voyage from the Weston Point Docks, Cheshire to Ardrossan, Ayrshire. |
| Weybosset | United States | The schooner was wrecked on the Pollock Rip. She was on a voyage from Portland, Maine to Philadelphia, Pennsylvania. |

== 14 August ==
List of shipwrecks: 14 August 1890
| Ship | State | Description |
|---|---|---|
| Dovenby | United Kingdom | The ship collided with the full-rigged ship Argomene (United Kingdom) and sank in the Atlantic Ocean off the coast of Brazil with the loss of six, seven or twelve of her crew. Dovenby was on a voyage from Antwerp, Belgium to Valparaíso, Chile. |
| Sarah Jane | United Kingdom | The fishing boat collided with the steamship Rennie (United Kingdom) and sank in the North Sea off Whitby, Yorkshire with the loss of two of her six crew. One of the survivors got aboard Rennie, the rest were rescued by the coble Wilhelmein (United Kingdom). |

== 15 August ==
List of shipwrecks: 15 August 1890
| Ship | State | Description |
|---|---|---|
| Annie | United Kingdom | The schooner was wrecked at Hastings, Sussex. Her crew were rescued. |
| Aslacoe | United Kingdom | The steamship was driven ashore and wrecked in Trepassey Bay, Newfoundland Colony. She was on a voyage from Montreal, Quebec, Dominion of Canada to Grimsby, Lincolnshire. |
| Cornelia | Germany | The schooner collided with a Norwegian barque off Skagen, Denmark. She was on a voyage from Vyborg, Russia to Hartlepool, County Durham, United Kingdom. She put in to Marstrand, Sweden in a waterlogged condition. |
| General Cathcart | United Kingdom | The schooner was driven ashore and wrecked at Portpatrick, Wigtownshire. Her four crew were rescued by the Portpatrick Lifeboa Civil Service No.3 ( Royal National Lifeboat Institution). |
| Vaagen | Norway | The schooner ran aground at Nairn, United Kingdom. She was on a voyage from Saint Petersburg, Russia to Nairn. She was refloated and taken in to Nairn in a leaky condition. |
| Witch | United Kingdom | The steam lighter sprang a leak and foundered off Skipness, Argyllshire. Her three crew survived. She was on a voyage from Ballachulish to Sandbank, Argyllshire. |

== 16 August ==
List of shipwrecks: 16 August 1890
| Ship | State | Description |
|---|---|---|
| Alku | Russia | The barque ran aground in the River Usk. She was on a voyage from Saint John's, Newfoundland Colony to Newport, Monmouthshire, United Kingdom. She was refloated and taken in to Newport in a severely leaky condition. Subsequently placed under repair. |
| Haaket | Norway | The schooner ran aground in the Larviksfjorden. She was refloated on 18 August with the assistance of a tug and found to be waterlogged. |
| Joseph Amedée | France | The schooner departed from Martinique for Bordeaux, Gironde. No further trace, reported missing. |
| Superior | Flag unknown | The ship collided with the fishing smack Redbeard (United Kingdom) in the Atlantic Ocean and was damaged. Superior was on a voyage from Söderhamn, Sweden to Cape Town, Cape Colony. She put in to Falmouth, Cornwall, United Kingdom. |

== 17 August ==
List of shipwrecks: 17 August 1890
| Ship | State | Description |
|---|---|---|
| Alku | (Russian Empire) Grand Duchy of Finland | The barque was driven ashore near "Kalawa Island". It was feared she would become a wreck. |
| Mary Graham | United Kingdom | The barque was driven ashore and wrecked at "Gargamelle", Newfoundland Colony. She was on a voyage from Quebec, Dominion of Canada to Newcastle upon Tyne, Northumberland. |
| Padre Ageno | Italy | The barque was destroyed by fire in the Atlantic Ocean. She was on a voyage from Hull, Yorkshire, United Kingdom to Buenos Aires, Argentina. |
| Seuta | Germany | The yacht foundered with the loss of two of her crew. |
| Spencer F. Baird | United States | During a voyage in the Fox Islands in the eastern Aleutian Islands from Pauloff Harbor on Sanak Island to Tigalda Island with a crew of two and a cargo of 2 1/2 tons of provisions and mining equipment, the 7.91-gross register ton, 31.8-foot (9.7 m) schooner was wrecked 2.5 nautical miles (4.6 km; 2.9 mi) east of Sankin Island (54°58′30″N 163°16′20″W) during a gale. Both crewmen survived. |

== 18 August ==
List of shipwrecks: 18 August 1890
| Ship | State | Description |
|---|---|---|
| Aura | United Kingdom | The pilot cutter collided with the steamship Galilee (France) and sank in the Bristol Channel 4 nautical miles (7.4 km) off Hartland Point, Devon. Her crew were rescued by Galilee. |
| Dictator | Norway | The barque was wrecked at "Pontenegra". Her crew were rescued. She was on a voyage from Ensenada, Mexico to Ship Island, Mississippi, United States. |
| Eva | Norway | The barque was driven ashore and wrecked on Goose Island, Newfoundland Colony. She was on a voyage from Gloucester, United Kingdom to Shediac, New Brunswick, Dominion of Canada. |
| Hurtig | Norway | The brig ran aground at Ballyshannon, County Donegal, United Kingdom. She was on a voyage from Saffi, Morocco to Ballyshannon. She was refloated on 21 August, but ran aground again. |
| Maria B. | Italy | The barque was driven ashore at Carrasco, Uruguay. |
| Redbrook | United Kingdom | The steamship collided with the steamship L'Amerique (France) and sank at Saint-Nazaire, Loire-Inférieure, France with the loss of three of her crew. She was on a voyage from Newport, Monmouthshire to Saint-Nazaire. |
| Two Fannies | United States | The barkentine foundered in a gale off Cleveland, Ohio. The crew were rescued by City of Detroit (United States). The wreck was removed in 1893. |
| No.52' | Royal Navy | The torpedo boat was driven ashore at Plymouth, Devon. She was refloated with assistance and found to be severely damaged. |

== 19 August ==
List of shipwrecks: 19 August 1890
| Ship | State | Description |
|---|---|---|
| Castor | French Navy | The despatch boat ran aground at La Pallice, Charente-Inférieure whilst avoiding a collision with Élan (French Navy). She was refloated. |
| Colorado | United Kingdom | The steamship ran aground off "Balakowa" and was severely damaged. |
| Joinville | France | The ship collided with the steamship Oronoque (France) at Pauillac, Gironde and was severely damaged. Joinville was on a voyage from Martinique to Pauillac. |

== 20 August ==
List of shipwrecks: 20 August 1890
| Ship | State | Description |
|---|---|---|
| Peter Graham | United Kingdom | The steamship ran aground in Portland Bay. She was refloated the next day and taken in to Portsmouth, Hampshire. |
| Skjoldmöen | Norway | The brigantine ran aground at Richibucto, New Brunswick, Dominion of Canada. She was refloated on 30 August. |
| Strathallan | United Kingdom | The steamship was driven ashore 6 nautical miles (11 km) south of Tor, Khedivate of Egypt. She was on a voyage from Liverpool, Lancashire to Penang, Malaya. She was refloated on 21 August and resumed her voyage. |
| T. C. Berg | Germany | The barque ran aground on Saltholmen, Denmark. She was on a voyage from Grimsby, Lincolnshire, United Kingdom to Danzig. She was refloated with assistance and resumed her voyage. |
| Vancouver | United Kingdom | The steamship collided with an iceberg in the Atlantic Ocean. She was on a voyage from Liverpool to Montreal, Quebec, Dominion of Canada. |
| Unnamed | Germany | The lighter sprang a leak and sank at Brake. |
| Unnamed | United Kingdom | The lighter sprang a leak and sak at Batoum, Russia. |

== 21 August ==
List of shipwrecks: 21 August 1890
| Ship | State | Description |
|---|---|---|
| Arthur | United Kingdom | The barge sank in the River Thames at Horsleydown, London. |
| Alexei | Russia | The steamship struck a tree stump and sank near "Kusmodenjansk". |
| Dania | Germany | The steamship was driven ashore in Jones Inlet, Long Island New York, United States. Her passengers were transferred to the steamship Augusta Victoria (Germany). Dania was later refloated and towed in to New York City. |
| S. Pizzati | United Kingdom | The steamship ran aground in Tela Bay, Spanish Honduras. She was on a voyage from Roatan Spanish Honduras to New Orleans, Louisiana. She was refloated the next day and resumed her voyage. |
| Turquoise | United Kingdom | The fishing smack collided with the fish carrier Lord Alfred Paget (United Kingdom) and sank in the North Sea with the loss of two of her four crew. |
| Wimburn | Norway | The barque collided with the steamship Darlington (United Kingdom) and sank in the Mediterranean Sea with the loss of a life. Her crew were rescued by Darlington. |

== 22 August ==
List of shipwrecks: 22 August 1890
| Ship | State | Description |
|---|---|---|
| Abeona | United Kingdom | The steamship collided with the quayside departing from Grimsby, Lincolnshire for Copenhagen, Denmark and was consequently beached on the Clee Sands. |
| Franklin | United Kingdom | The steamship ran aground in the Danube 44 nautical miles (81 km) from its mouth. She was refloated on 25 August. |
| General Werder | Germany | The steamship was driven ashore at Nagasaki, Japan. She was refloated. |
| Joseph | Norway | The barque was wrecked on a reef off Entrance Island, Queensland. She was on a voyage from Sydney, New South Wales to Cádiz, Spain. |
| Royal Duke | United Kingdom | The brigantine struck a rock off Cooktown, Queensland and was wrecked. |
| Saint Mary | United States | The ship collided with the steamship Eaton Hall (United Kingdom) at Stanley, Falkland Islands. She was beached and wrecked. Saint Mary was on a voyage from New York to San Francisco, California. |

== 23 August ==
List of shipwrecks: 23 August 1890
| Ship | State | Description |
|---|---|---|
| Aideen | United Kingdom | The yacht sank off Weymouth, Dorset. Her crew were rescued by the yachts Mayflower and Sunbeam (both United Kingdom). |
| Hercules | Norway | The barque ran aground at Grangemouth, Stirlingshire, United Kingdom. She was on a voyage from Grangemouth to Cronstadt, Russia. She was refloated and towed in to Leith, Lothian, United Kingdom for repairs. |
| James | United Kingdom | The ship ran ashore on Salt Island, Anglesey. She was on a voyage from London to Liverpool, Lancashire. She was refloated and taken in to Holyhead, Anglesey. |
| Parker M. Whitmore | United States | The ship was driven ashore at Lockport, Newfoundland Colony. She was on a voyge from Avonmouth, Somerset, United Kingdom to the Delaware Breakwater. |
| St. Monan | United Kingdom | The ship ran aground in the Nordzee Kanaal near Velsen, North Holland, Netherlands. She was on a voyage from Rangoon, Burma to Zaandam, North Holland. She was refloated and completed her voyage. |
| Vistka | Russia | The steamship ran aground in the River Thames near Tilbury Fort, Essex, United Kingdom. She was on a voyage from Gravesend, Kent, United Kingdom to Saint Petersburg. She was refloated the next day and resumed her voyage. |

== 24 August ==
List of shipwrecks: 24 August 1890
| Ship | State | Description |
|---|---|---|
| Alice | United Kingdom | The yacht sank off the North Foreland, Kent. All six people on board were rescued by a fishing trawler. |
| Arcadian, Castries, and Elene | Romania | The tugboat Arcadian, and the lighters Castries and Elene ran aground in the Danube downstream of "Widdim". Elene was refloated. |
| Fin | Norway | The barque was driven ashore at Louisbourg, Nova Scotia, Dominion of Canada. She was on a voyage from Bristol, Gloucestershire, United Kingdom to Quebec, Dominion of Canada. |
| Mentmore | United Kingdom | The steamship put in to Plymouth Sound on fire. She was on a voyage from London to Boston, Massachusetts, United States. The fire was extinguished. |
| Renown | United Kingdom | The schooner departed from Saint Petersburg, Russia for Great Yarmouth, Norfolk. No further trace, reported overdue. |
| Tasmania | United States | The schooner collided with the steamship G. H. Wade (United States) and sank in Lake George, New York. |

== 25 August ==
List of shipwrecks: 25 August 1890
| Ship | State | Description |
|---|---|---|
| Black Head | Denmark | The steamship ran aground at Saltholmen. She was on a voyage from Riga, Russia to Belfast, County Antrim, United Kingdom. |
| Ella Sayer | United Kingdom | The steamship ran aground in the Danube 22 nautical miles (41 km) from its mouth. |
| Nestor | United Kingdom | The steamship was driven ashore at "Lamkoo", 40 nautical miles (74 km) west of Hoihow, China. She was later refloated and taken in to Hoihow. |
| Pan | Norway | The brig was driven ashore and capsized at Færder. She was on a voyage from Christiania to Calais, France. |
| Seaman's Glory | United Kingdom | The galley capsized and sank in the English Channel off the Gull Lightship ( Trinity House) with the loss of four of the seven people on board. Survivors were rescued by the steamship Neptune (United Kingdom). Seaman's Glory was on a voyage from the Goodwin Sands to Deal, Kent. |
| Skjold | Norway | The barque was driven ashore and wrecked at Storbaden, Sweden. She was on a voyage from London, United Kingdom to "Christinestad". |

== 26 August ==
List of shipwrecks: 26 August 1890
| Ship | State | Description |
|---|---|---|
| Autocrat | Norway | The ship collided with a schooner and was severely damaged. She was on a voyage from Moss to New York. She put in to Barven the next day. |
| Cape Breton | Flag unknown | The steamship was driven ashore at Petty Harbour, Newfoundland Colony. Her crew were rescued. |
| Fu Yew | China | The steamship was driven ashore on the Shantung Peninsula. She was on a voyage from Shanghai to Newchwang. She was a total loss. |
| Mathilde | Russia | The barque was driven ashore and wrecked near Hanko, Grand Duchy of Finland. She was on a voyage from Sörnäs to Honfleur, Manche, France. |
| Navigator | Norway | The barque was driven ashore on Far Point, Sicily, Italy. She was on a voyage from Marseille, Bouches-du-Rhône, France to Girgenti, Sicily. She was refloated and taken in to Messina, Sicily for repairs. |
| Sloboda | Austria-Hungary | The barque was wrecked on Cherso Island. She was on a voyage from Fiume to Oran, Algeria. |

== 27 August ==
List of shipwrecks: 27 August 1890
| Ship | State | Description |
|---|---|---|
| Argoll | Norway | The barque was driven ashore at "Langes Kjner". |
| Atalanta | Norway | The brig capsized at Muhlgraben, near Riga, Russia. |
| Charles T. Jones | United Kingdom | The steamship ran aground at Civitavecchia, Italy. She was on a voyage from the Newcastle upon Tyne, Northumberland to Civitavecchia. She was refloated. |
| Fearmount | Flag unknown | The steamship was driven ashore at the mouth of the Bellinger River, New South Wales. |
| Fred Smth | United States | The schooner was driven ashore and wrecked on Mosquito Island. She was on a voyage from New York to Bangor, Maine. |
| Glenbervie | United Kingdom | The ship ran aground at Deadman's Point, County Sligo. She was on a voyage from Portland, Maine, United States to Sligo. She was refloated, but then ran aground on the Metal Man Rock. She was refloated. |
| Isca | United Kingdom | The barque was driven ashore and wrecked in Possession Bay, Chile. She was on a voyage from the Straits of Magellan to London. |
| Resolve | Norway | The barque was wrecked at Little Bay, Newfoundland Colony. Her crew were rescued by Ulunda (United Kingdom). Resolve was on a voyage from Richibucto, New Brunswick, Dominion of Canada to South Shields, County Durham, United Kingdom. |
| Salo | Russia | The barque was driven ashore at "Barsund", Grand Duchy of Finland. |
| Thomas Pope | United States | The barque was wrecked at Point Hope, District of Alaska. |
| Unnamed | Flag unknown | The steamship sank 8 nautical miles (15 km) south of Jomfruland, Norway. |

== 28 August ==
List of shipwrecks: 28 August 1890
| Ship | State | Description |
|---|---|---|
| Alcestis | United Kingdom | The ship was driven ashore near "Ta Sile, Ras Gharbia Point", or on "Scirop Point". |
| Harvest Queen | Dominion of Canada | The full-rigged ship caught fire at Cardiff, Glamorgan, United Kingdom. The fire was extinguished. |
| La Plata | France | The steamship ran aground in the Gironde. She was refloated. |
| Laura | United Kingdom | The brigantine was abandoned off the Outer Dowsing Sandbank, in the North Sea off the coast of Norfolk. Her crew survived. She was on a voyage from Southampton, Hampshire to Middlesbrough, Yorkshire. She was discovered 40 nautical miles (74 km) off the Dudgeon Sandbank by the lugger Mayflower (United Kingdom). She was taken in to Lowestoft, Suffolk. |
| Lion | United Kingdom | The ship was struck by a cyclone and abandoned at sea. Her crew were rescued. She was on a voyage from Lunenburg, Nova Scotia, Dominion of Canada to Jamaica. |
| Mathilda | Sweden | The brig was wrecked near Visby, Denmark. Some of her crew were reported missing. She was on a voyage from Cagliari, Sardinia, Italy to Gothenburg. |
| Portuense | United Kingdom | The steamship foundered off Anegada, Virgin Islands. Ten of her 29 crew were lost. She was on a voyage from Baltimore, Maryland, United States to Pará, Brazil. |

== 29 August ==
List of shipwrecks: 29 August 1890
| Ship | State | Description |
|---|---|---|
| Gannet | United Kingdom | The steamship collided with the steamship Sorrento (Germany) off Cuxhaven, Germany and was severely damaged. |
| Saucy Jack | United Kingdom | The smack sprang a leak and foundered in the Bristol Channel 4 nautical miles (7.4 km) off Caldy Island, Pembrokeshire. Her crew survived. |
| Whitehall | United Kingdom | The steamship collided with the quayside at Grimsby, Lincolnshire and sprang a leak. She was on a voyage from Grimsby to Lisbon, Portugal. She was detained for repairs. |

== 30 August ==
List of shipwrecks: 30 August 1890
| Ship | State | Description |
|---|---|---|
| Dux | Norway | The barque ran aground at Buctouche, New Brunswich, Dominion of Canada. She was on a voyage from Buctouche to a European port. |
| Indrani | United Kingdom | The steamship caught fire at Avonmouth, Somerset. |
| Lady Ailsa | United Kingdom | The steamship ran aground on the Four Rocks. Her nine crew were rescued by the yacht Tjemila (France). Lady Ailsa was refloated and towed in to Saint-Nazaire, Loire-Inférieure, France by the tug Great Western (United Kingdom) on 1 September. |

== 31 August ==
List of shipwrecks: 31 August 1890
| Ship | State | Description |
|---|---|---|
| Abbie Clifford | United States | The brigantine was abandoned at sea. All on board took to a raft although one person was subsequently drowned. Survivors were rescued on 4 September by the barque Beatrice (United Kingdom). She was on a voyage from Fernandina Beach, Florida to San Fernando |
| Aubepine | France | The ship was lost at Havana, Cuba. |
| Express, Fletcher, James, two fishing smacks, and three tugs | Russia; United Kingdom; United Kingdom; United Kingdom; United Kingdom | The steamship Foreningen (Denmark) broke from her moorings at Great Yarmouth, Norfolk. She collided with, and damaged, the schooner Express, the lighter Fletcher, the Thames barge James, two fishing smacks and three tugs. |
| Silver Spray | United Kingdom | The steam yacht ran aground at Longman, Inverness-shire. She was refloated the next day. |
| Wilhelm Gynther | Sweden | The barque was abandoned in the Atlantic Ocean. She was on a voyage from Pensacola, Florida, United States to Rouen, Seine-Inférieure, France. |

== Unknown date ==
List of shipwrecks: Unknown date in August 1890
| Ship | State | Description |
|---|---|---|
| Advance | United States | The dredger was run into by the steamship Norge (Norway) and sank in Lower New York Bay. |
| Alice | Norway | The brig ran aground on the Shipwash Sand, in the North Sea off the coast of Suffolk, United Kingdom. She was refloated and towed in to Harwich, Essex, United Kingdom by the tug Harwich (United Kingdom). |
| Amelie | Norway | The schooner was lost in Borgarfjörður, Iceland before 20 August. Her crew were rescued. She was on a voyage from Mandal, Norway, to Iceland. |
| America | Norway | The barque ran aground on the Frittien Shoal. She was refloated and taken under tow by Johanna (Flag unknown). |
| Anna Maria | Sweden | The barque was abandoned at sea. Her crew were rescued. She was on a voyage from Mobile, Alabama, United States to Wolgast, Germany. |
| Anunda | Norway | The barque was driven ashore and wrecked on Martín García Island, Argentina in mid-August. She was on a voyage from Newport, Monmouthshire, United Kingdom to Rosario, Argentina |
| Aracan | Sweden | The barque ran aground in the Caicos Islands. She was on a voyage from a port in Haiti to Falmouth, Cornwall, United Kingdom. She was refloated and resumed her voyage. |
| Ashlands | United Kingdom | The steamship ran aground in the Danube upstream of Galaţi, Romania. She was refloated and resumed her voyage to Brăila. |
| Aspatogran | United Kingdom | The barque was wrecked at sea by a cyclone before 21 August. Her thirteen crew were rescued. She was on a voyage from Port of Spain, Trinidad to Philadelphia, Pennsylvania, United States. |
| Elizabeth Morton | Norway | The schooner was abandoned at sea. Her crew were rescued. She was subsequently towed in to Mandal. |
| Elter Water | United Kingdom | The schooner was driven ashore at Ravenglass, Cumberland. She was refloated on 31 August and take in to Whitehaven, Cumberland. |
| Federation | France | The barque capsized at Saigon, French Indo-China. She was later righted. |
| Fiodora | Norway | The brig was driven ashore in the Svenska Högarne, Sweden. She was refloated and put in to Stockholm, Sweden in a leaky condition. |
| Flid | Norway | The ship collided with Westa (Russia) and sank in the Baltic Sea. |
| George Heaton | United Kingdom | The steamship ran aground at Gallipoli, Ottoman Empire. She was refloated on 27 August. |
| Gerda | Norway | The barque was wrecked on Cape Sable Island, Nova Scotia. Her crew were rescued. She was on a voyage from Barbadoes to Quebec. |
| Grimaldi | United Kingdom | The schooner ran aground on the Pladda Reef. She was refloated on 20 August and towed in to Lamlash, Isle of Arran. |
| Harold | Sweden | The steamship was driven ashore. She was refloated and put in to Stockholm on 8 August for repairs. |
| Latharna | United Kingdom | The steamship ran aground on the Soldiers Ledge. She was on a voyage from Philadelphia to Glace Bay, Nova Scotia. She was consequently condemned. |
| Mary Culmer | United Kingdom | The ship was wrecked on Grand Turk, Turks Islands. She was on a voyage from New York, United States to a port in Haiti. |
| Mondego | United Kingdom | The ship was driven ashore at Varennes, Quebec, Dominion of Canada. She was refloated. |
| Monkshaven | United Kingdom | The steamship was damaged by fire at Taganrog, Russia. |
| Nijssina | Netherlands | The schooner was driven ashore and wrecked near Lysekil, Sweden. She was on a voyage from Delfzijl, Groningen to Gothenburg, Sweden. |
| Princess of Wales | United Kingdom | The steamship sank at Gravesend, Kent. She was later refloated. |
| Saint Augustin | France | The schooner was driven ashore on Mozambique. She was refloated and taken in to "Parapat" in a severely leaky condition. |
| Saint Gothard | United Kingdom | The steamship was driven ashore. |
| Sorrento | Norway | The steamship foundered in the North Sea before 24 August. Her crew were rescued by the steamship Cerenaria (United Kingdom). Sorrento was on a voyage from Pori, Grand Duchy of Finland to London, United Kingdom. |
| HMS Speedwell | Royal Navy | The Sharpshooter-class torpedo gunboat collided with a steamship in the Atlantic Ocean. |
| St. Augustin | France | The schooner was driven ashore on Mozambique. She was refloated and taken in to "Parapat" in a severely leaky condition. |
| Sundswall | Netherlands | The barque was abandoned in the Baltic Sea. She was on a voyage from Sundsvall, Sweden to Bo'ness, Lothian, United Kingdom. She was subsequently towed in to "Borgia", where she was condemned. |
| Thesna | Flag unknown | The ship was driven ashore. She was on a voyage from Holmsund, Sweden to Whitby, Yorkshire, United Kingdom. She was refloated and found to be leaky. |
| Ulunda | United Kingdom | The steamship ran aground on the Cow Ledge, off Briar Island, Nova Scotia. She was on a voyage from Saint John, New Brunswick to Halifax, Nova Scotia. |
