= HMS Jason (1892) =

Gunboat of the Royal Navy

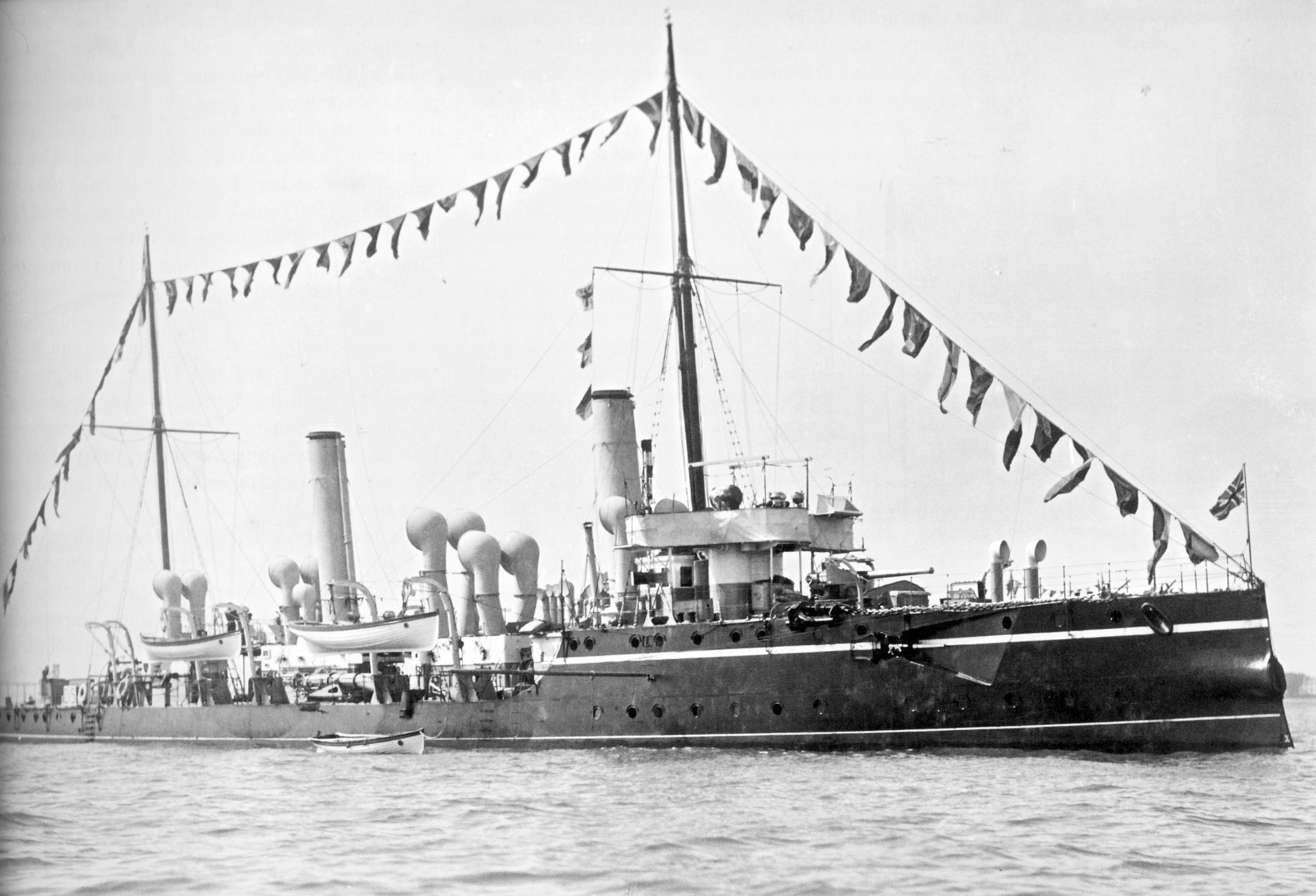

History

United Kingdom
- Name: HMS Jason
- Builder: Naval Construction & Engineering Co., Barrow-in-Furness
- Laid down: 7 September 1891
- Launched: 14 May 1892
- Completed: June 1893
- Fate: Sunk 7 April 1917

General characteristics
- Class & type: Alarm-class torpedo gunboat
- Displacement: 810 long tons (820 t)
- Length: 230 ft 0 in (70.10 m) pp
- Beam: 27 ft 0 in (8.23 m)
- Draught: 8 ft 6 in (2.59 m)
- Installed power: 3,500 ihp (2,600 kW)
- Propulsion: 2× triple expansion steam engines; 2 shafts
- Speed: 18.7 kn (21.5 mph; 34.6 km/h)
- Complement: 91
- Armament: 2 × 4.7 in (120 mm) QF guns; 4 × 3-pounder (47 mm ) guns; 1 × Gardiner machine gun; 3 × 18 inch torpedo tubes

HMS Jason was an Alarm-class torpedo gunboat of the British Royal Navy. She was built by the Naval Construction & Engineering Co. from 1891–1893. She was converted to a minesweeper in 1908–1909 and continued these duties during the First World War. Jason was sunk by a German mine on 7 April 1917.

== Design and construction ==
Jason was one of 11 Alarm-class torpedo gunboats ordered for the Royal Navy under the 1889 Naval Defence Act, which authorised the shipbuilding programme for the next five years, and also included the last two torpedo gunboats of the Sharpshooter class and the five torpedo gunboats of the Dryad class. The Alarms were slightly modified versions of the previous Sharpshooter class, with modified engines to improve reliability.

Jason was 230 feet (70.10 m) long between perpendiculars, with a beam of 27 feet (8.23 m) and a draught of 12 feet (3.66 m). Displacement was 810 long tons (820 t). Two triple-expansion steam engines, fed by four locomotive boilers, drove two propeller shafts. The machinery was heavier than that installed in the Sharpshooters, and was slightly downrated (from 3,600 indicated horsepower (2,700 kW) to 3,500 indicated horsepower (2,600 kW)) to improve reliability. This gave a speed of 18.7 knots (34.6 km/h; 21.5 mph).

The ship was armed with two 4.7-inch (120 mm) QF guns mounted fore and aft on the ship's centreline, backed up by four 3-pounder (47 mm) guns (two in single mounts on the ship's beam and two in casemates forward) and a single .45-inch Gardner machine gun. Three 18-inch (450 mm) torpedo tubes were fitted, with one fixed in the ship's bow and the other two on swivelling mounts on the beam. The ship had a crew of 91.

Jason was laid down at the Naval Construction & Engineering Co.'s (later Vickers Armstrong) Barrow-in-Furness shipyard on 7 September 1891, was launched on 14 May 1892 and completed in June 1893 at a cost of £49,253.

== Service ==
In August 1894 Jason took part in that year's Naval Manoeuvres, but, owing to problems with her engines, was sent into Milford Haven for repair. In July 1896 she again took part in the Manoeuvres. On 26 June 1897 Jason was present at the Jubilee Fleet Review at Spithead. Jason took part in the 1900 Naval Manoeuvres in July that year.

Jason left Plymouth for Glasgow in September 1902, and was fitted by the Fairfield Shipbuilding and Engineering Company with water-tube boilers and new engines, which were rated at 5,800 indicated horsepower (4,300 kW) in 1903. During sea trials, the refitted ship reached a speed of 21.9 knots (25.2 mph; 40.6 km/h). Jason returned to Sheerness following her re-engining refit on 14 July 1903.

Jason was in reserve at Chatham in 1906, but joined the Home Fleet in 1907. In June 1909, after refit, Jason rejoined the Nore Destroyer Flotilla.

Jason was converted to a minesweeper in 1909, She had her boilers re-tubed at Sheerness Dockyard at the end of 1911, and rejoined the Nore division of the Home Fleet at the end of the refit in April 1912.

On the outbreak of the First World War Jason joined the newly established Grand Fleet. In August 1914, the minesweepers attached to the Grand Fleet, including Jason were employed on carrying out daily sweeps of the Pentland Firth. On 17 December 1914, Jason and the torpedo gunboats Gossamer and Skipjack were on passage from Lowestoft to Scapa Flow, when they were temporarily diverted to help to deal with a minefield laid off Scarborough on 16 December.

On 7 April 1917, (Note: 3 April according to Naval Staff Monograph No. 34.) Jason and sister ship Circe were sweeping a minefield between Mull and Coll in the Inner Hebrides, Western Scotland, when Jason struck a mine which had been laid by the German submarine U-78 on 12 February. Jason sank, with Circe rescuing the survivors. 25 of Jason's crew were killed, (Note: 30 according to Naval Staff Monograph No. 34.) with the body of only one crew member recovered from the sea.

== Wreck ==
The wreck of Jason was located, 100 meters below the surface of the water, in April 2022 and granted protected status under the Protection of Military Remains Act in 2026.

== Pennant numbers ==
Pennant number.	From	To
N18	1914	-

== Bibliography ==
- Brassey, T. A., ed. (1895). The Naval Annual 1895. Portsmouth, UK: J Griffin and Co.
- Brassey, T. A., ed. (1897). The Naval Annual 1897. Portsmouth, UK: J Griffin and Co.
- Brassey, T. A., ed. (1898). The Naval Annual 1898. Portsmouth, UK: J Griffin and Co.
- Brassey, T. A., ed. (1905). The Naval Annual 1905. Portsmouth, UK: J Griffin and Co.
- Brown, Les (2023). Royal Navy Torpedo Vessels. Barnsley, UK: Seaforth Publishing. ISBN 978-1-3990-2285-9.
- Colledge, J. J.; Warlow, Ben (2006). Ships of the Royal Navy: The Complete Record of all Fighting Ships of the Royal Navy from the 15th Century to the Present. London: Chatham Publishing. ISBN 9781861762818.
- Chesneau, Roger; Kolesnik, Eugene M., eds. (1979). Conway's All the World's Fighting Ships 1860–1905. London: Conway Maritime Press. ISBN 0-85177-133-5.
- Dittmar, F. J.; Colledge, J. J. (1972). British Warships 1914–1919. Shepperton, UK: Ian Allan. ISBN 0-7110-0380-7.
- Friedman, Norman (2009). British Destroyers: From Earliest Days to the Second World War. Barnsley, UK: Seaforth Publishing. ISBN 978-1-84832-049-9.
- Gardiner, Robert; Gray, Randal, eds. (1985). Conway's All The World's Fighting Ships 1906–1921. London: Conway Maritime Press. ISBN 0-85177-245-5.
- Hepper, David (2006). British Warship Losses in the Ironclad Era 1860–1919. London: Chatham Publishing. ISBN 9781861762733.
- Jellicoe, John (1919). The Grand Fleet 1914–1916: Its Creation, Development and Work. London: Cassell & Company.
- Kemp, Paul (1999). The Admiralty Regrets: British Warship Losses of the 20th Century. Stroud, UK: Sutton Publishing. ISBN 0-7509-1567-6.
- Leyland, John, ed. (1901). The Naval Annual 1901. Portsmouth, UK: J Griffin and Co.
- Monograph No. 23: Home Waters Part I: From the Outbreak of War to 27 August 1914 (PDF). Naval Staff Monographs (Historical). Vol. X. Naval Staff, Training and Staff Duties Division. 1924.
- Monograph No. 28: Home Waters Part III: From November 1914 to the end of January 1915 (PDF). Naval Staff Monographs (Historical). Vol. XII. Naval Staff, Training and Staff Duties Division. 1925.
- Monograph No. 34: Home Waters Part VIII: December 1916 to April 1917 (PDF). Naval Staff Monographs (Historical). Vol. XVIII. Naval Staff, Training and Staff Duties Division. 1933.
- Moore, John (1990). Jane's Fighting Ships of World War I. London: Studio Editions. ISBN 1-85170-378-0.
- "Lost at sea for a century, sunken First World War gunboat is finally found". Daily Telegraph. 22 April 2022.
