= HMS Skipjack (1889) =

Gunboat of the Royal Navy

History

United Kingdom
- Name: HMS Skipjack
- Builder: Chatham Dockyard
- Laid down: 4 Julyl 1888
- Launched: 30 April 1889
- Completed: July 1891
- Fate: Sold 1920

General characteristics
- Class & type: Sharpshooter-class torpedo gunboat
- Displacement: 735 long tons (747 t)
- Length: 230 ft 0 in (70.10 m) pp
- Beam: 27 ft 0 in (8.23 m)
- Draught: 10 ft 6 in (3.20 m)
- Installed power: 3,600 ihp (2,700 kW)
- Propulsion: 2× triple expansion steam engines; 2 shafts
- Speed: 19 kn (22 mph; 35 km/h)
- Complement: 91
- Armament: 2 × 4.7 in (120 mm) QF guns; 4 × 3-pounder (47 mm ) guns; 5 × 14 inch torpedo tubes

HMS Skipjack was a Sharpshooter-class torpedo gunboat of the British Royal Navy. She was built at Chatham Dockyard from 1888–1891. She was converted to a minesweeper in 1908–1909 and continued these duties during the First World War. Skipjack survived the war and was sold for scrap in 1920.

== Design and construction ==
The Sharpshooter-class was designed under the leadership of William Henry White, the Director of Naval Construction, to be faster and more seaworthy than the preceding prototype torpedo gunboat, Rattlesnake and the three Grasshopper class ships, while carrying a heavier armament. As torpedo gunboats, they were intended to defend the fleet from attack by torpedo-boats, while being capable of carrying out torpedo attacks themselves.

The Sharpshooters were larger than the preceding ships, with a raised forecastle to improve seakeeping. They were 242 feet 0 inches (73.76 m) long overall and 230 feet (70 m) between perpendiculars, with a beam of 27 feet 0 inches (8.23 m) and a draught of 10 feet 7 inches (3.23 m). Displacement was 735 long tons (747 t). (Note: While most sources list displacement as 735 long tons (747 t), Friedman gives a displacement of 828 long tons (841 t) normal and 1,070 long tons (1,090 t) full load.) Two triple-expansion steam engines, fed by four locomotive boilers, drove two propeller shafts. The machinery was intended to produce 4,500 indicated horsepower (3,400 kW) giving a speed of 21–22 knots (24–25 mph; 39–41 km/h). The use of locomotive boilers was not a success, with the machinery being unreliable and unable to provide the expected power. The machinery actually delivered 3,600 indicated horsepower (2,700 kW) giving a speed of 18.7 knots (21.5 mph; 34.6 km/h) when forced and 2,500 indicated horsepower (1,900 kW) giving 16.5 knots (19.0 mph; 30.6 km/h) under natural draught.

The ship was armed with two 4.7 inch (120 mm) QF guns mounted fore and aft on the ships centreline, backed up by four 3-pounder (47 mm) guns (two in single mounts on the ship's beam and two in casemates forward). Five 14-inch torpedo tubes were fitted (one fixed in the ship's bow and two twin mounts), with three reload torpedoes carried. The ship had a crew of 91.

Skipjack was laid down at Chatham dockyard on 4 July 1888 was launched on 30 April 1889 and completed in July 1891 at a cost of £59,531.

== Service ==
On 26 June 1897 Skipjack was present at the Jubilee Fleet Review at Spithead, In 1898 Skipjack was sent to Palmers of Jarrow for refit. Skipjack had her locomotive boilers replaced by Reed water-tube boilers in early 1900, which increased power and reliability. Skipjack's new machinery delivered over 6,000 indicated horsepower (4,500 kW) giving a speed of 21.1 knots (24.3 mph; 39.1 km/h). Skipjack took part in the Royal Navy's annual manoeuvres in July–August 1900, and again in 1901. In January 1901 she was a tender to the cruiser Melampus in Kingstown.

In 1905 Skipjack was in reserve, but after refit, she returned to active service as part of the Fishery Protection Squadron in 1907. In 1909 she was converted to a minesweeper, a conversion that resulted in her torpedo tubes being removed. On the night of 7/8 June 1910, Skipjack collided with the Cross Sands light vessel when on passage between Harwich and Grimsby. The ship's navigating officer was court martialed and convicted of negligently hazarding his vessel, and was severely reprimanded, losing three months seniority. On 8 October 1910 Skipjack arrested the French trawler G599, which had been caught fishing within British territorial waters in the Thames estuary. The skipper of the trawler was fined five guineas for the offence. In January 1911 Skipjack completed a refit at Chatham and returned to fishery protection duties in the North Sea.

=== First World War ===
On the outbreak of the First World War Skipjack joined the newly established Grand Fleet at Scapa Flow in Orkney. In August 1914, the minesweepers attached to the Grand Fleet, including Skipjack were employed on carrying out daily sweeps of the Pentland Firth. In early October 1914, as part of expensive Grand Fleet operations to protect a large convoy carrying Canadian troops across the Atlantic to England, Skipjack was led eight minesweeping gunboats on patrols between Orkney and Shetland. On 27 October, the battleship Audacious struck a mine off Tory Island, north-west of Lough Swilly, and despite efforts to tow her to safety, sank later that day. As a result, Skipjack together with sister ships Speedwell and Seagull were ordered from Scapa Flow to join Leda and Circe in clearing this minefield.

On 18 November 1914 Skipjack and the gunboat Circe were about to start a minesweeping run in the channel between Fair Island and North Ronaldsay when Skipjack' commanding officer sighted the conning tower of the German submarine U-22. The two gunboats set off at full speed in pursuit, but the submarine outpaced them and dived to safety after a chase of 45 minutes. On the evening of 24 November 1914, the German submarine U-16 was off the east coast of Orkney when she was spotted by a group of trawlers that were minesweeping. The trawlers summoned nearby gunboats, and at 1 pm the next day, Skipjack spotted U-16, but the submarine dived to safety and escaped. While the German official history records that Skipjack fired on U-16, this is not confirmed by Skipjack's log or official report of the incident. On 17 December 1914, Skipjack and the torpedo gunboats Jason and Gossamer were on passage from Lowestoft to Scapa Flow, when they were temporarily diverted to help to deal with a minefield laid off Scarborough during the Bombardment of Scarborough on 16 December.

In early May 1917 Skipjack and three other torpedo gunboats were sent to sweep a minefield laid by the German submarine UC-68 in the approaches to the Clyde which was holding up shipping from the Clyde and Liverpool. Skipjack was a member of the Second Fleet Sweeping Flotilla, based at Scapa Flow as part of the Grand Fleet, in July 1917. In 1918 she was a member of the 13th Fast Minesweeper Flotilla at Oban .

== Disposal ==
Skipjack was sold for scrap to Hammond Land Foundry of Dublin on 23 February 1920.

== Pennant numbers ==
Pennant number	Dates
P81	1914–January 1918
PA3	January 1918 –

== Bibliography ==
- Brassey, T. A., ed. (1895). The Naval Annual 1895. Portsmouth, UK: J Griffin and Co.
- Brassey, T. A., ed. (1898). The Naval Annual 1898. Portsmouth, UK: J Griffin and Co.
- Brassey, T. A., ed. (1902). The Naval Annual 1902. Portsmouth, UK: J Griffin and Co.
- Brown, D. K. (2003). Warrior to Dreadnought: Warship Development 1860–1905. London: Chatham Publishing. ISBN 1-84067-5292.
- Brown, Les (2023). Royal Navy Torpedo Vessels. Barnsley, UK: Seaforth Publishing. ISBN 978-1-3990-2285-9.
- Chesneau, Roger; Kolesnik, Eugene M., eds. (1979). Conway's All the World's Fighting Ships 1860–1905. London: Conway Maritime Press. ISBN 0-85177-133-5.
- Corbett, Julian S. (1921). Naval Operations: Volume II. History of the Great War. London: Longmans, Green and Co.
- Dittmar, F. J.; Colledge, J. J. (1972). British Warships 1914–1919. Shepperton, UK: Ian Allan. ISBN 0-7110-0380-7.
- Friedman, Norman (2009). British Destroyers: From Earliest Days to the Second World War. Barnsley, UK: Seaforth Publishing. ISBN 978-1-84832-049-9.
- Gardiner, Robert; Gray, Randal, eds. (1985). Conway's All The World's Fighting Ships 1906–1921. London: Conway Maritime Press. ISBN 0-85177-245-5.
- Jane, Fred T., ed. (1970) [Originally published 1906 by Sampson Low Marston: London]. Jane's Fighting Ships 1906/7. Newton Abbot, UK: David & Charles (Publishers). ISBN 0-7153-4715-2.
- Jellicoe, John (1919). The Grand Fleet 1914–1916: Its Creation, Development and Work. London: Cassell & Company.
- Leyland, John, ed. (1901). The Naval Annual 1901. Portsmouth, UK: J Griffin and Co.
- Massie, Robert K. (2007). Castles of Steel: Britain, Germany and the Winning of the Great War at Sea. London: Vintage Books. ISBN 978-0-099-52378-9.
- Monograph No. 23: Home Waters Part I: From the Outbreak of War to 27 August 1914 (PDF). Naval Staff Monographs (Historical). Vol. X. Naval Staff, Training and Staff Duties Division. 1924.
- Monograph No. 24: Home Waters Part II: September and October 1914 (PDF). Naval Staff Monographs (Historical). Vol. XI. Naval Staff, Training and Staff Duties Division. 1924.
- Monograph No. 28: Home Waters Part III: From November 1914 to the end of January 1915 (PDF). Naval Staff Monographs (Historical). Vol. XII. Naval Staff, Training and Staff Duties Division. 1925.
- Monograph No. 35: Home Waters Part IX: 1st May 1917 to 31st July 1917 (PDF). Naval Staff Monographs (Historical). Vol. XIX. Naval Staff, Training and Staff Duties Division. 1939.
- Moore, John (1990). Jane's Fighting Ships of World War I. London: Studio Editions. ISBN 1-85170-378-0.
