= HMS Gossamer (1890) =

Gunboat of the Royal Navy

History

United Kingdom
- Name: HMS Gossamer
- Builder: Sheerness Dockyard
- Laid down: 21 January 1889
- Launched: 9 January 1890
- Completed: 16 September 1891
- Fate: Sold 1920

General characteristics
- Class & type: Sharpshooter-class torpedo gunboat
- Displacement: 735 long tons (747 t)
- Length: 230 ft 0 in (70.10 m) pp
- Beam: 27 ft 0 in (8.23 m)
- Draught: 10 ft 6 in (3.20 m)
- Installed power: 3,600 ihp (2,700 kW)
- Propulsion: 2× triple expansion steam engines; 2 shafts
- Speed: 19 kn (22 mph; 35 km/h)
- Complement: 91
- Armament: 2 × 4.7 in (120 mm) QF guns; 4 × 3-pounder (47 mm ) guns; 5 × 14 inch torpedo tubes

HMS Gossamer was a Sharpshooter-class torpedo gunboat of the British Royal Navy. She was built at Sheerness Dockyard from 1889–1891. She was converted to a minesweeper in 1909 and continued these duties during the First World War. Gossamer was sold for scrap in 1920.

== Design and construction ==
The Sharpshooter-class was designed under the leadership of William Henry White, the Director of Naval Construction, to be faster and more seaworthy than the preceding prototype torpedo gunboat, Rattlesnake and the three Grasshopper-class torpedo gunboat ships, while carrying a heavier armament. As torpedo gunboats, they were intended to defend the fleet from attack by torpedo-boats, while being capable of carrying out torpedo attacks themselves.

The Sharpshooters were larger than the preceding ships, with a raised forecastle to improve seakeeping. They were 242 feet 0 inches (73.76 m) long overall and 230 feet (70 m) between perpendiculars, with a beam of 27 feet 0 inches (8.23 m) and a draught of 10 feet 7 inches (3.23 m). Displacement was 735 long tons (747 t). (Note: While most sources list displacement as 735 long tons (747 t), Friedman gives a displacement of 828 long tons (841 t) normal and 1,070 long tons (1,090 t) full load.) Two triple-expansion steam engines, fed by four locomotive boilers, drove two propeller shafts. The machinery was intended to produce 4,500 indicated horsepower (3,400 kW) giving a speed of 21–22 knots (24–25 mph; 39–41 km/h). The use of locomotive boilers was not a success, with the machinery being unreliable and unable to provide the expected power. The machinery actually delivered 3,600 indicated horsepower (2,700 kW) giving a speed of 18.7 knots (21.5 mph; 34.6 km/h) when forced and 2,500 indicated horsepower (1,900 kW) giving 16.5 knots (19.0 mph; 30.6 km/h) under natural draught.

The ship was armed with two 4.7 inch (120 mm) QF guns mounted fore and aft on the ships centreline, backed up by four 3-pounder (47 mm) guns (two in single mounts on the ship's beam and two in casemates forward). Five 14-inch torpedo tubes were fitted (one fixed in the ship's bow and two twin mounts), with three reload torpedoes carried. The ship had a crew of 91.

Gossamer was laid down at Sheerness Dockyard on 21 January 1889 and launched on 9 January 1890. She was completed on 16 September 1891 at a cost of £54,490.

== Service ==
Gossamer was used for a series of trials at Chatham on the effects of forced versus induced draught (i.e. air being blown through the boiler versus air being pulled through the boiler) in 1893 and 1894. In August 1894 Gossamer took part in that year's Naval Manoeuvres. On 26 June 1897 Gossamer was present at the Jubilee Fleet Review at Spithead,

Gossamer was refitted with Reed water-tube boilers in 1902. In 1906 she was in commission as a tender to HMS Pembroke, the base ship at Chatham for training ratings in the operation of water tube boilers. In 1909 she joined the Home Fleet, commissioning at Devonport. In June 1909 she took part in that year's naval manoeuvres, deploying to Berehaven in Ireland. Late that year Gossamer was converted to a minesweeper, which involved removing the torpedo tubes.

In May 1910 Gossamer was sent to Haulbowline for refit, with her crew transferring to the sloop Espiegle. On 6 November 1910, Gossamer was operating in Weymouth Bay when one of her boats capsized while heading to Portland, with two of her crew drowned. In May 1911 she temporarily replaced the sloop Ringdove on fishery protection duties operating out of Invergordon. In 1912 Gossamer joined the 1st Fleet.

=== First World War ===
On the outbreak of the First World War Gossamer joined the newly established Grand Fleet at Scapa Flow in Orkney. In August 1914, the minesweepers attached to the Grand Fleet, including Gossamer were employed on carrying out daily sweeps of the Pentland Firth. In October 1914 Gossamer was based at Devonport. On 17 December 1914, Gossamer and the torpedo gunboats Jason and Skipjack were on passage from Lowestoft to Scapa Flow, when they were temporarily diverted to help to deal with a minefield laid off Scarborough during the Bombardment of Scarborough on 16 December.

On 16 July 1915, Gossamer and the gunboats Circe and Speedwell were on the way from Scapa Flow to carry out an anti-submarine patrol off Muckle Flugga when Speedwell spotted the German submarine U-41 250 yards (230 m) off her port bow. Speedwell rammed the submarine, which turned over onto her side before disappearing. U-41 had both periscopes damaged and was forced to abort her patrol and return to home.

Gossamer was a member of the Second Fleet Sweeping Flotilla, based at Scapa Flow as part of the Grand Fleet, in July 1917. At the end of the war she was based at Oban in the west of Scotland as part of the 13th Minesweeping Flotilla.

== Fate ==
Gossamer was sold for scrap on 20 March 1920 to the Cornish Salvage Company of Ilfracombe.

== Pennant numbers ==
Pennant number	Dates
D68	1914–September 1915
N68	September 1915–January 1918
N52	January 1918 –

== Bibliography ==
- Brassey, T. A., ed. (1895). The Naval Annual 1895. Portsmouth, UK: J Griffin and Co.
- Brassey, T. A., ed. (1898). The Naval Annual 1898. Portsmouth, UK: J Griffin and Co.
- Brassey, T. A., ed. (1902). The Naval Annual 1902. Portsmouth, UK: J Griffin and Co.
- Brown, D. K. (2003). Warrior to Dreadnought: Warship Development 1860–1905. London: Chatham Publishing. ISBN 1-84067-5292.
- Brown, Les (2023). Royal Navy Torpedo Vessels. Barnsley, UK: Seaforth Publishing. ISBN 978-1-3990-2285-9.
- Chesneau, Roger; Kolesnik, Eugene M., eds. (1979). Conway's All the World's Fighting Ships 1860–1905. London: Conway Maritime Press. ISBN 0-85177-133-5.
- Corbett, Julian S. (1921). Naval Operations: Volume II. History of the Great War. London: Longmans, Green and Co.
- Dittmar, F. J.; Colledge, J. J. (1972). British Warships 1914–1919. Shepperton, UK: Ian Allan. ISBN 0-7110-0380-7.
- Friedman, Norman (2009). British Destroyers: From Earliest Days to the Second World War. Barnsley, UK: Seaforth Publishing. ISBN 978-1-84832-049-9.
- Gardiner, Robert; Gray, Randal, eds. (1985). Conway's All The World's Fighting Ships 1906–1921. London: Conway Maritime Press. ISBN 0-85177-245-5.
- Jane, Fred T., ed. (1970) [Originally published 1906 by Sampson Low Marston: London]. Jane's Fighting Ships 1906/7. Newton Abbot, UK: David & Charles (Publishers). ISBN 0-7153-4715-2.
- Jellicoe, John (1919). The Grand Fleet 1914–1916: Its Creation, Development and Work. London: Cassell & Company.
- Monograph No. 23: Home Waters Part I: From the Outbreak of War to 27 August 1914 (PDF). Naval Staff Monographs (Historical). Vol. X. Naval Staff, Training and Staff Duties Division. 1924.
- Monograph No. 24: Home Waters Part II: September and October 1914 (PDF). Naval Staff Monographs (Historical). Vol. XI. Naval Staff, Training and Staff Duties Division. 1924.
- Monograph No. 28: Home Waters Part III: From November 1914 to the end of January 1915 (PDF). Naval Staff Monographs (Historical). Vol. XII. Naval Staff, Training and Staff Duties Division. 1925.
- Monograph No. 30: Home Waters Part V: From July to October 1915 (PDF). Naval Staff Monographs (Historical). Vol. XIV. Naval Staff, Training and Staff Duties Division. 1926.
- Monograph No. 35: Home Waters Part IX: 1st May 1917 to 31st July 1917 (PDF). Naval Staff Monographs (Historical). Vol. XIX. Naval Staff, Training and Staff Duties Division. 1939.
- Moore, John (1990). Jane's Fighting Ships of World War I. London: Studio Editions. ISBN 1-85170-378-0.
