= HMS Speedwell (1889) =

British naval ship

History

United Kingdom
- Name: HMS Speedwell
- Builder: Devonport Dockyard
- Laid down: 18 April 1888
- Launched: 15 March 1889
- Completed: 1 July 1890
- Fate: Sold 1920

General characteristics
- Class & type: Sharpshooter-class torpedo gunboat
- Displacement: 735 long tons (747 t)
- Length: 230 ft 0 in (70.10 m) pp
- Beam: 27 ft 0 in (8.23 m)
- Draught: 10 ft 6 in (3.20 m)
- Installed power: 3,600 ihp (2,700 kW)
- Propulsion: 2× triple expansion steam engines; 2 shafts
- Speed: 19 kn (22 mph; 35 km/h)
- Complement: 91
- Armament: 2 × 4.7 in (120 mm) QF guns; 4 × 3-pounder (47 mm ) guns; 5 × 14 inch torpedo tubes

HMS Speedwell was a Sharpshooter-class torpedo gunboat of the British Royal Navy. She was built at Devonport Dockyard from 188–1890. She was converted to a minesweeper in 1909 and continued these duties during the First World War. Speedwell was sold for scrap in 1920.

== Design and construction ==
The Sharpshooter-class was designed under the leadership of William Henry White, the Director of Naval Construction, to be faster and more seaworthy than the preceding prototype torpedo gunboat, Rattlesnake and the three Grasshopper class ships, while carrying a heavier armament. As torpedo gunboats, they were intended to defend the fleet from attack by torpedo-boats, while being capable of carrying out torpedo attacks themselves.

The Sharpshooters were larger than the preceding ships, with a raised forecastle to improve seakeeping. They were 242 feet 0 inches (73.76 m) long overall and 230 feet (70 m) between perpendiculars, with a beam of 27 feet 0 inches (8.23 m) and a draught of 10 feet 7 inches (3.23 m). Displacement was 735 long tons (747 t). (Note: While most sources list displacement as 735 long tons (747 t), Friedman gives a displacement of 828 long tons (841 t) normal and 1,070 long tons (1,090 t) full load.) Two triple-expansion steam engines, fed by four locomotive boilers, drove two propeller shafts. The machinery was intended to produce 4,500 indicated horsepower (3,400 kW) giving a speed of 21–22 knots (24–25 mph; 39–41 km/h). The use of locomotive boilers was not a success, with the machinery being unreliable and unable to provide the expected power. The machinery actually delivered 3,600 indicated horsepower (2,700 kW) giving a speed of 18.7 knots (21.5 mph; 34.6 km/h) when forced and 2,500 indicated horsepower (1,900 kW) giving 16.5 knots (19.0 mph; 30.6 km/h) under natural draught.

The ship was armed with two 4.7 inch (120 mm) QF guns mounted fore and aft on the ships centreline, backed up by four 3-pounder (47 mm) guns (two in single mounts on the ship's beam and two in casemates forward). Five 14-inch torpedo tubes were fitted (one fixed in the ship's bow and two twin mounts), with three reload torpedoes carried. The ship had a crew of 91.

Speedwell was laid down at Devonport Dockyard on 12 April 1888 and launched on 15 March 1889. She was completed on 1 July 1890 at a cost of £52,000.

== Service ==
In August 1890, Speedwell collided with a steamship in the Atlantic Ocean, sustaining minor damage. In August 1894 Speedwell took part in that year's Naval Manoeuvres. She again took part in the Naval Manoeuvres in August the next year, where she suffered leaks in one of her high pressure pistons. Under the command of Commander William Benwell, she arrived at Sheerness dockyard from Scotland in September 1902 for a refit. She left for Scotland to join the Home Fleet the following month, and in November 1902 was at Queensferry during the visit of the German Imperial yacht SMY Hohenzollern.

Speedwell was refitted with Reed water-tube boilers in 1903. Speedwell was in reserve at Chatham in 1906 and joined the Home Fleet in 1907. On 14 December 1907 one of Speedwell's cutters capsized just off Sheerness Pier. Eight of the fourteen men aboard the cutter were drowned. In 1908 she underwent an extensive refit at Sheerness dockyard, with her boilers being re-tubed, and was converted to a minesweeper in 1908–1909.

=== First World War ===
On the outbreak of the First World War Speedwell joined the newly established Grand Fleet at Scapa Flow in Orkney. In August 1914, the minesweepers attached to the Grand Fleet, including Speedwell were employed on carrying out daily sweeps of the Pentland Firth. On 27 October, the battleship Audacious struck a mine off Tory Island, north-west of Lough Swilly, and despite efforts to tow her to safety, sank later that day. As a result, Speedwell together with sister ships Skipjack and Seagull were ordered from Scapa Flow to join Leda and Circe in clearing this minefield.

On 16 July 1915, Speedwell and the gunboats Circe and Gossamer were on the way from Scapa Flow to carry out an anti-submarine patrol off Muckle Flugga when Speedwell spotted the German submarine U-41 250 yards (230 m) off her port bow. Speedwell rammed the submarine, which turned over onto her side before disappearing. U-41 had both periscopes damaged and was forced to abort her patrol and return to home.

Speedwell was a member of the Second Fleet Sweeping Flotilla, based at Scapa Flow as part of the Grand Fleet, in July 1917.

== Disposal ==
Speedwell was sold for scrap on 20 March 1920 to the Cornish Salvage Company of Ilfracombe.

== Pennant numbers ==
| Pennant number | Dates |
|---|---|
| P68 | 1914–January 1918 |
| PA4 | January 1918 – |

== Bibliography ==
- Brassey, T. A., ed. (1895). The Naval Annual 1895. Portsmouth, UK: J Griffin and Co.
- Brown, D. K. (2003). Warrior to Dreadnought: Warship Development 1860–1905. London: Chatham Publishing. ISBN 1-84067-5292.
- Brown, Les (2023). Royal Navy Torpedo Vessels. Barnsley, UK: Seaforth Publishing. ISBN 978-1-3990-2285-9.
- Chesneau, Roger; Kolesnik, Eugene M., eds. (1979). Conway's All the World's Fighting Ships 1860–1905. London: Conway Maritime Press. ISBN 0-85177-133-5.
- Corbett, Julian S. (1921). Naval Operations: Volume II. History of the Great War. London: Longmans, Green and Co.
- Dittmar, F. J.; Colledge, J. J. (1972). British Warships 1914–1919. Shepperton, UK: Ian Allan. ISBN 0-7110-0380-7.
- Friedman, Norman (2009). British Destroyers: From Earliest Days to the Second World War. Barnsley, UK: Seaforth Publishing. ISBN 978-1-84832-049-9.
- Gardiner, Robert; Gray, Randal, eds. (1985). Conway's All The World's Fighting Ships 1906–1921. London: Conway Maritime Press. ISBN 0-85177-245-5.
- Jane, Fred T., ed. (1970) [Originally published 1906 by Sampson Low Marston: London]. Jane's Fighting Ships 1906/7. Newton Abbot, UK: David & Charles (Publishers). ISBN 0-7153-4715-2.
- Jellicoe, John (1919). The Grand Fleet 1914–1916: Its Creation, Development and Work. London: Cassell & Company.
- Leyland, John, ed. (1901). The Naval Annual 1901. Portsmouth, UK: J Griffin and Co.
- Massie, Robert K. (2007). Castles of Steel: Britain, Germany and the Winning of the Great War at Sea. London: Vintage Books. ISBN 978-0-099-52378-9.
- Monograph No. 23: Home Waters Part I: From the Outbreak of War to 27 August 1914 (PDF). Naval Staff Monographs (Historical). Vol. X. Naval Staff, Training and Staff Duties Division. 1924.
- Monograph No. 24: Home Waters Part II: September and October 1914 (PDF). Naval Staff Monographs (Historical). Vol. XI. Naval Staff, Training and Staff Duties Division. 1924.
- Monograph No. 28: Home Waters Part III: From November 1914 to the end of January 1915 (PDF). Naval Staff Monographs (Historical). Vol. XII. Naval Staff, Training and Staff Duties Division. 1925.
- Monograph No. 30: Home Waters Part V: From July to October 1915 (PDF). Naval Staff Monographs (Historical). Vol. XIV. Naval Staff, Training and Staff Duties Division. 1926.
- Monograph No. 35: Home Waters Part IX: 1st May 1917 to 31st July 1917 (PDF). Naval Staff Monographs (Historical). Vol. XIX. Naval Staff, Training and Staff Duties Division. 1939.
- Moore, John (1990). Jane's Fighting Ships of World War I. London: Studio Editions. ISBN 1-85170-378-0.
