= HMS Spanker (1889) =

Gunboat of the Royal Navy

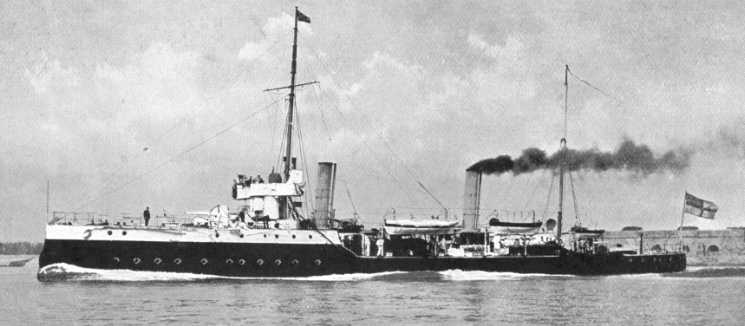

History

United Kingdom
- Name: HMS Spanker
- Builder: Devonport Dockyard
- Laid down: 12 April 1888
- Launched: 22 February 1889
- Commissioned: 17 October 1890
- Reclassified: Minesweeper in 1909
- Fate: Sold in 1920 for breaking

General characteristics
- Class & type: Sharpshooter-class torpedo gunboat
- Displacement: 735 tons
- Length: 242 ft (74 m) oa, 230 ft (70 m) pp
- Beam: 27 ft (8.2 m)
- Draught: 8 ft 6 in (2.59 m)
- Installed power: 2,500 ihp (1,900 kW) (natural draught); 3,600 ihp (2,700 kW) (forced draught)
- Propulsion: 2 × triple-expansion steam engines; Locomotive boilers (replaced c. 1897 by Du Temple boilers); 2 × screws
- Speed: 19 kn (35 km/h)
- Range: 2,500 nmi (4,600 km) at 10 kn (19 km/h)
- Complement: 91
- Armament: As torpedo gunboat: 5 × 14-inch (360 mm) torpedo tubes (3 reloads); 2 × QF 4.7-inch (12 cm) guns; 4 × 3-pounder guns; As minesweeper: 2 × QF 4.7-inch (12 cm) guns; 4 × 3-pounder guns; minesweeping gear

HMS Spanker was a Sharpshooter-class torpedo gunboat of the Royal Navy. She was launched in 1889, converted to a minesweeper in 1909 and sold for breaking in 1920.

== Construction ==
Spanker was laid down at Devonport Dockyard on 12 April 1888 and launched on 22 February 1889. She was commissioned at Devonport on 17 October 1890. It was common for the officers of smaller vessels with poor accommodation to be housed in the local guardship, and Spanker's officers were borne in Indus.

Her class were fitted with 2 sets of triple-expansion steam engines, and in Spanker's case these were built by G E Bayliss & Co. She was fitted at build with locomotive boilers, but these were replaced with water-tube Du Temple boilers some time between 1895 and 1898. The bottom of these boilers, unlike normal Du Temple boilers, were cylindrical with end doors, instead of with bolted covers. Twin screws propelled her at up to 19 knots (35 km/h; 22 mph) with forced draught.

== Service ==
=== Naval manoeuvres (1892) ===
During naval manoeuvres in 1892 Spanker and the monitor Gorgon were disabled by leaky boilers and defective steering gear.

=== Naval Review (1897) ===
She was present at the Naval Review at Spithead in celebration of Queen Victoria's Diamond Jubilee on 26 June 1897.

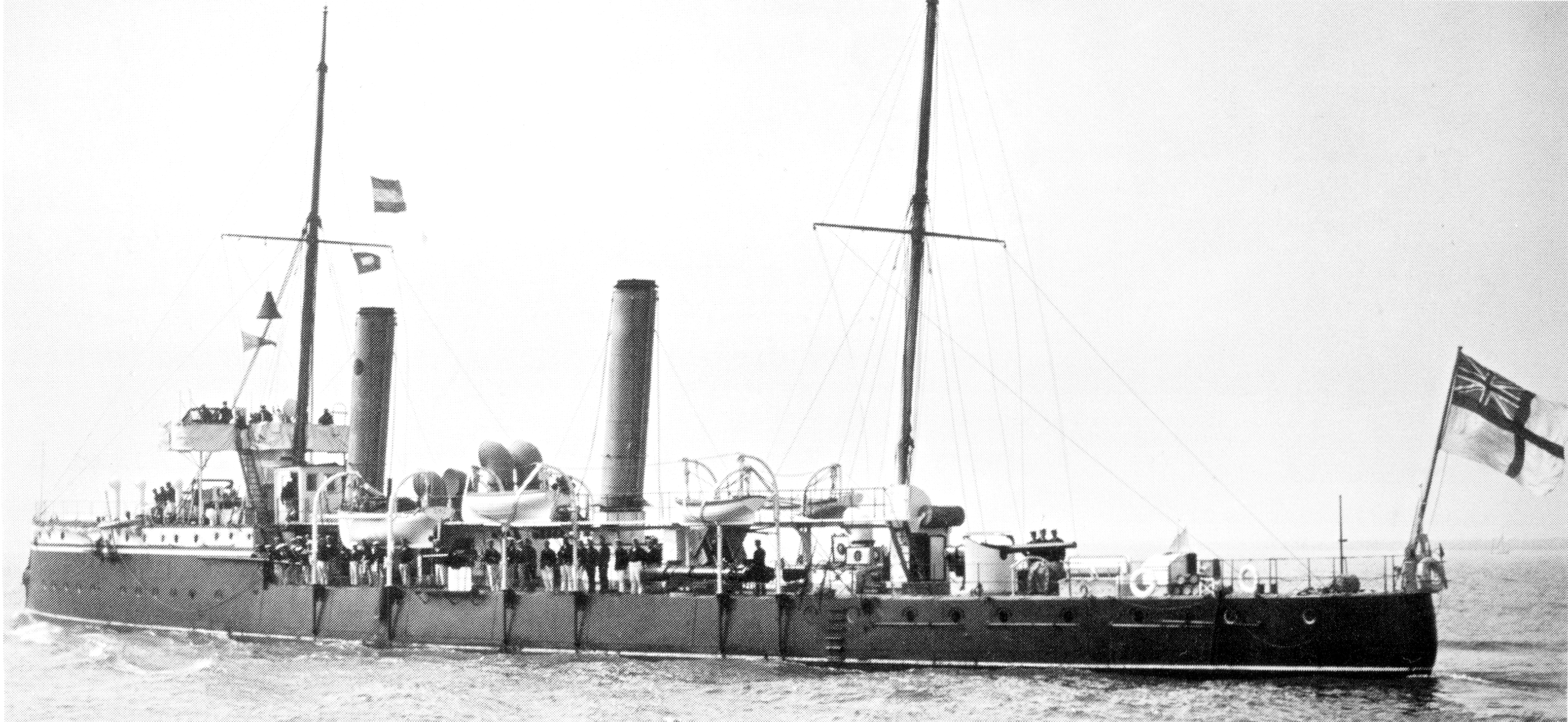
Spanker as a torpedo gunboat pre-1909

=== Naval manoeuvres (1900) ===
She was mobilised for naval manoeuvres on 10 July 1900.

Lieutenant Thomas Brandreth was appointed in command 14 January 1902, when she served in the Channel Fleet. She took part in the fleet review held at Spithead on 16 August 1902 for the coronation of King Edward VII.

=== Diving experiments (1906) ===
In 1906, Spanker took part in a Royal Navy investigation of deep-sea diving. Lieutenant Damant and Gunner Catto, from the Spanker, descended into a Scottish loch in diving-suits to the depth of 210 feet (64 m), at that time a record for the British Isles. The former records were held by employees of Messrs Siebe and Gorman, London, who, in a patented dress, descended 189 feet (58 m) and 192 feet (59 m). On 8 March 1908 Spanker was on passage from Portsmouth to Sheerness where she was to join up with ships of the Nore Division of the Home Fleet for Naval exercises when her engines failed off Bembridge on the Isle of Wight. While under tow back to Portsmouth, she ran aground off Southsea Castle, and was not freed until the next day. In November 1908, Spanker entered refit at Pembroke Dockyard, with the ship requiring partial replating of her decks. The refit was completed by 1 March 1909.

=== Conversion to minesweeper (1909) ===
In 1909 she and four of her sister ships were converted to minesweepers. The torpedo tubes were removed, but the ships retained their guns. The minesweeping equipment constituted a kite winch and gallows fitted on the quarterdeck. She was assigned to the North Sea Fisheries as a tender to Halcyon under the orders of the Admiral Commanding Coast Guard and Reserves.

=== World War I ===
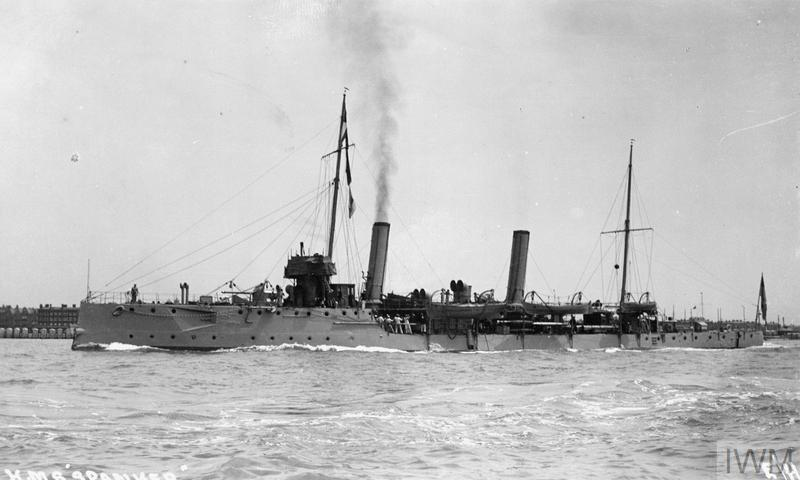
Torpedo gunboat Spanker in WW1

On 15 April 1913 Spanker was recommissioned at Portsmouth and served throughout World War I. From 1914, under Lieutenant Commander N M C Thurstan and then Lieutenant Commander F C Corbyn, she served in the North Sea. In June 1915, Spanker was attached to the Grand Fleet, but in July that year, she moved with sister ship Seagull to Harwich in order to support operations of the Harwich Force.

From 1917, under the command of Lieutenant H Annall RNR, she formed part of the 13th Fast Minesweeping Flotilla at Oban. (Note: The 13th Minesweeping Flotilla comprised the Sharpshooter-class vessels Spanker, Speedwell, Skipjack and Gossamer and the Alarm-class vessels Leda and Circe. The flotilla was "fast" in contrast with the other Oban-based minesweeping flotilla, the 14th, which was composed of 4 paddle minesweepers.)

The ship lying near the roadside was the Spanker ... The ship was on service all through the war, and still wears her drab active service colours, which, however, are now much weather-worn. Her fittings and gear, too, were rusty, and the ship looked a typical old veteran, which fact possibly gave her an added interest to the longshoremen, while the youngsters never missed an opportunity to roam around the vessel. Now the Spanker has moved across to the other side of the harbour, alongside all that remains of a sister ship, and soon she, too, will be reduced to a mass of broken and twisted metal, which may, possibly, some day, help in building another vessel.

— Ilfracombe Chronicle, Saturday 10 July 1920

== Fate ==
By 1919 she was listed on the disposal list as a first class gunboat. She was sold on 20 March 1920 to the Cornish Salvage Company of Ilfracombe for breaking.

== Bibliography ==
- Brown, Les (2023). Royal Navy Torpedo Vessels. Barnsley, UK: Seaforth Publishing. ISBN 978-1-3990-2285-9.
- Dorling, Taprell (1935). Swept Channels: Being an Account of the Work of the Minesweepers in the Great War. London: Hodder and Stoughton.
- Monograph No. 30: Home Waters Part V: From July to October 1915 (PDF). Naval Staff Monographs (Historical). Vol. XIV. Naval Staff, Training and Staff Duties Division. 1926.
- Lyon, David & Winfield, Rif (2004). The Sail and Steam Navy List: All the Ships of the Royal Navy 1815–1889. Chatham Publishing. ISBN 978-1-86176-032-6. OCLC 52620555.
