= HMS Karrakatta =

Gunboat of the Royal Navy

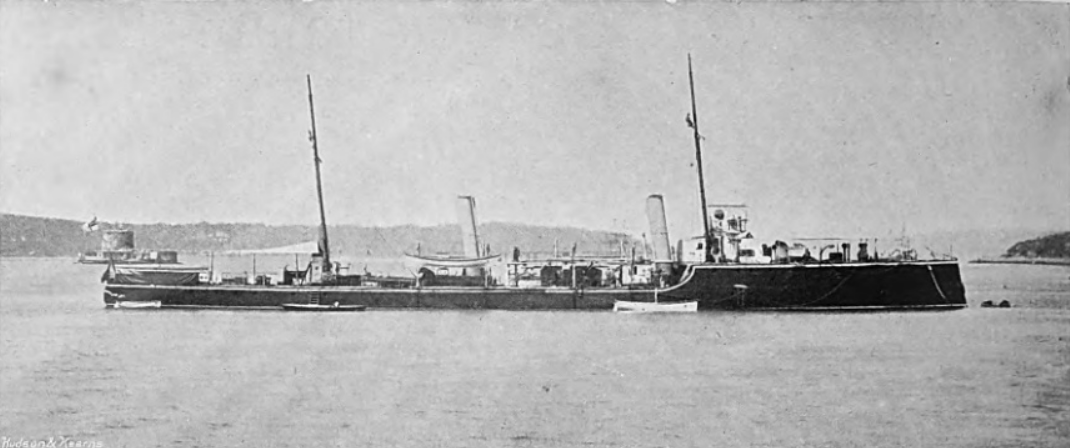
- Karrakatta c.1898

History

United Kingdom
- Name: HMS Wizard (1889–1890); HMS Karrakatta (1890–1905)
- Builder: Armstrong Whitworth, Elswick
- Yard number: 546
- Laid down: 17 August 1888
- Launched: 27 August 1889
- Commissioned: February 1891
- Fate: Sold in July 1905 at Portsmouth.

General characteristics
- Type: Torpedo gunboat
- Displacement: 735 tons
- Length: 242 ft (74 m) oa, 230 ft (70 m) pp
- Beam: 27 ft (8.2 m)
- Draught: 8 ft 6 in (2.59 m)
- Installed power: 2,500 ihp (1,900 kW) (natural draught); 3,600 ihp (2,700 kW) (forced draught)
- Propulsion: 2 × triple-expansion steam engines; Locomotive boilers; Twin screws; (later re-boilered with water-tube boilers)
- Speed: 19 kn (35 km/h)
- Range: 2,500 nmi (4,600 km) at 10 kn (19 km/h)
- Complement: 91
- Armament: 5 × 14-inch (360 mm) torpedo tubes (3 reloads); 2 × QF 4.7-inch (12 cm) guns; 4 × 3-pounder guns

HMS Karrakatta (or Karakatta) was a Sharpshooter-class torpedo gunboat of the Royal Navy, launched in 1889. She was part of the Auxiliary Squadron of the Australia Station from 1890 until 1903, and was sold in 1905.

== Design ==
Sir William White designed the Sharpshooter class in 1888. They had a length overall of 242 ft (74 m), a beam of 27 ft (8.2 m) and a displacement of 735 tons. They were engined with two sets of triple-expansion steam engines, two locomotive-type boilers, and twin screws. This layout produced 2,500 indicated horsepower (1,900 kW) with natural draught and 3,600 indicated horsepower (2,700 kW) with forced draught, giving them a top speed of 19 knots (35 km/h). They carried 100 tons of coal, giving them a range of about 2,500 nautical miles (4,600 km) at 10 knots (19 km/h) and were manned by 91 sailors and officers.

=== Armament ===
At build the class was fitted with two QF 4.7-inch (12 cm)/45-pounder guns and four 3-pounder guns. Five 14-inch (360 mm) torpedo tubes were fitted, and three reloads were provided.

== Construction and career ==
Originally named Wizard, she was built by Armstrong Whitworth, Elswick, Tyne and Wear, being laid down as yard number 546 on 17 August 1888. She was launched on 27 August 1889.

Renamed Karrakatta on 2 April 1890, and commissioned for the first time in February 1891, she formed part of the Auxiliary Squadron of the Australia Station. She arrived in Sydney with the squadron on 5 September 1891, and in 1900 was reported as "employed in the protection of the floating trade in Australian waters". Lieutenant Godfrey Edwin Corbett was appointed in command in November 1900. She left the Australia Station on 4 December 1903, and paid off in April 1904.

She was sold for £1875 in July 1905 at Portsmouth.
