= HMS Boomerang =

Gunboat of the Royal Navy

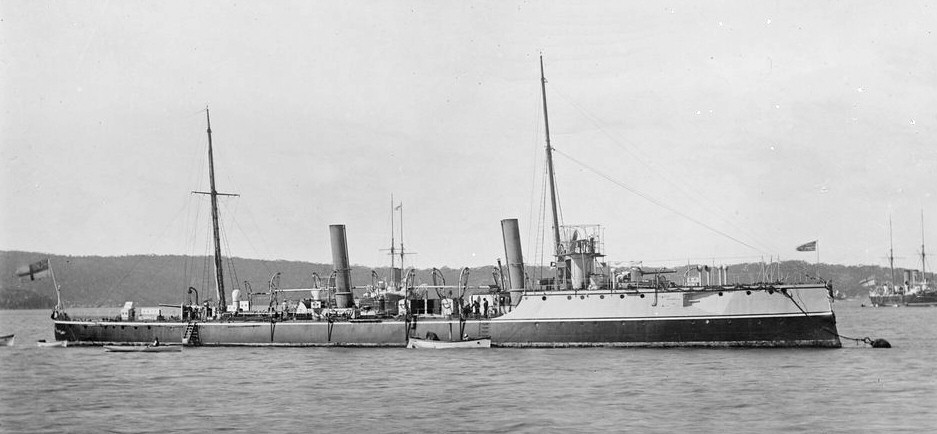
- Boomerang anchored at Sydney in c. 1891–1905.

History

United Kingdom
- Name: Whiting
- Builder: Armstrong Whitworth, Elswick, Tyne and Wear
- Yard number: 545
- Laid down: 17 August 1888
- Launched: 24 July 1889
- Completed: 14 February 1891
- Renamed: HMS Boomerang – 2 April 1890
- Fate: Sold 11 July 1905 at Portsmouth, Hampshire.

General characteristics
- Type: Torpedo gunboat
- Displacement: 735 tons
- Length: 242 ft (74 m)
- Beam: 27 ft (8.2 m)
- Draught: 8 ft 6 in (2.59 m)
- Installed power: 3,600 ihp (2,700 kW)
- Propulsion: Twin triple-expansion steam engines; Locomotive boilers; Twin screws; (later re-boilered with water-tube boilers)
- Speed: 19 kn (35 km/h)
- Complement: 91
- Armament: Five 14-inch (360 mm) torpedo tubes (3 reloads); Two QF 4.7-inch (12 cm) guns; Four 3-pounder guns

HMS Boomerang was an Sharpshooter-class torpedo gunboat of the Royal Navy, originally named HMS Whiting, built by Armstrong Whitworth, Elswick, Tyne and Wear and launched on 24 July 1889. Renamed Boomerang on 2 April 1890, she formed part of the Auxiliary Squadron of the Australia Station.

== Service details ==
She was at Sheerness in April 1891. Boomerang arrived in Sydney with the squadron on 5 September 1891.

She left the Australia Station on 22 August 1904. She was sold for £1,900 in July 1905 at Portsmouth.
