= HMS Circe (1892) =

Gunboat of the Royal Navy

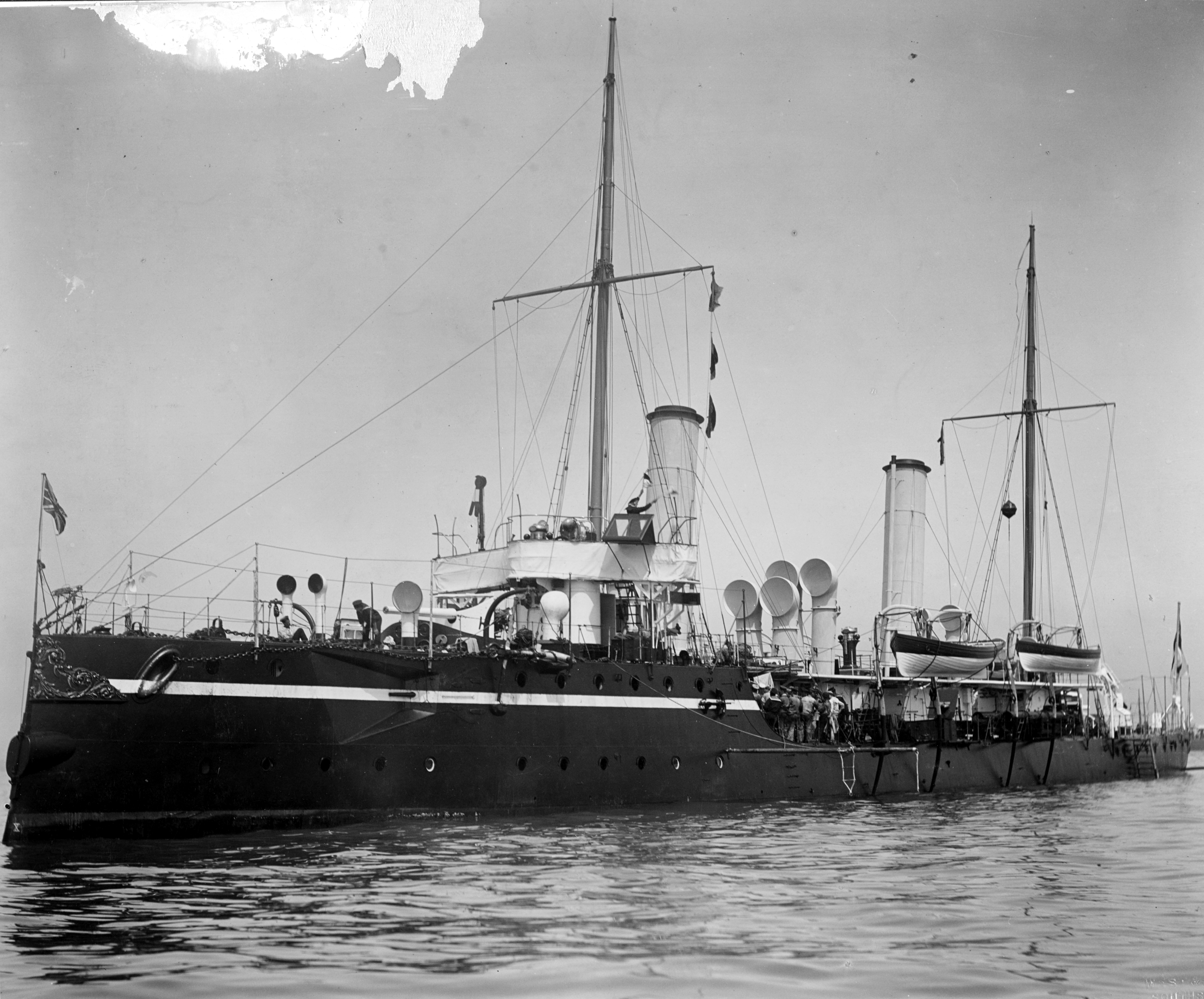

History

United Kingdom
- Name: HMS Circe
- Builder: Sheerness Dockyard
- Laid down: 11 January 1890
- Launched: 14 June 1892
- Completed: July 1893
- Fate: Scrapped 1920

General characteristics
- Class & type: Alarm-class torpedo gunboat
- Displacement: 810 long tons (820 t)
- Length: 230 ft 0 in (70.10 m) pp
- Beam: 27 ft 0 in (8.23 m)
- Draught: 8 ft 6 in (2.59 m)
- Installed power: 3,500 ihp (2,600 kW)
- Propulsion: 2× triple expansion steam engines; 2 shafts
- Speed: 18.7 kn (21.5 mph; 34.6 km/h)
- Complement: 91
- Armament: 2 × 4.7 in (120 mm) QF guns; 4 × 3-pounder (47 mm ) guns; 1 × Gardiner machine gun; 5 × 14-inch torpedo tubes

HMS Circe was an Alarm-class torpedo gunboat of the British Royal Navy. She was built by Sheerness Dockyard from 1890 to 1893. She was converted to a minesweeper in 1908–1909 and continued these duties during the First World War. Circe was sold for scrap in 1920.

== Design and construction ==
Circe was one of 11 Alarm-class torpedo gunboats ordered for the Royal Navy under the 1889 Naval Defence Act, which authorised the shipbuilding programme for the next five years, and also included the last two torpedo gunboats of the Sharpshooter class and the five torpedo gunboats of the Dryad class. The Alarms were slightly modified versions of the previous Sharpshooter class, with modified engines to improve reliability.

Circe was 230 feet (70.10 m) long between perpendiculars, with a beam of 27 feet (8.23 m) and a draught of 12 feet (3.66 m). Displacement was 810 long tons (820 t). Two triple-expansion steam engines, fed by four locomotive boilers, drove two propeller shafts. The machinery was heavier than that installed in the Sharpshooters, and was slightly downrated (from 3,600 indicated horsepower (2,700 kW) to 3,500 indicated horsepower (2,600 kW)) to improve reliability. This gave a speed of 18.7 knots (34.6 km/h; 21.5 mph).

The ship was armed with two 4.7-inch (120 mm) QF guns mounted fore and aft on the ship's centreline, backed up by four 3-pounder (47 mm) guns (two in single mounts on the ship's beam and two in casemates forward) and a single Gardner machine gun. Five 14-inch torpedo tubes were fitted (one fixed in the ship's bow and two twin mounts), with three reload torpedoes carried. The ship had a crew of 91.

Circe was laid down at Sheerness Dockyard on 11 January 1891 and launched on 14 June 1892. She reached a speed of 19.3 knots (22.2 mph; 35.7 km/h) during sea trials and was completed in May 1893 at a cost of £61,979.

== Service ==
In August 1894 Circe took part in that year's Naval Manoeuvres, and in July 1896 again took part in the Manoeuvres. On 26 June 1897 Circe was present at the Jubilee Fleet Review at Spithead. Circe took part in the 1900 Naval Manoeuvres in July that year.

In 1901 Circe was re-engined and had her locomotive boilers replaced by Thornycroft water-tube boilers. This greatly increased the power and reliability of the ship's machinery, which delivered 5,800 indicated horsepower (4,300 kW) during sea trials, giving a speed of 21.6 knots (24.9 mph; 40.0 km/h). Despite these improvements, she was still too slow for effective use against much faster torpedo boats and destroyers. Lieutenant Stewart Ayscough Perry-Ayscough was appointed in command on 31 March 1902, and in October that year she was based at Harwich for fishery duties and as tender to the coast guard ship stationed there. She paid off at Sheerness on 11 December 1902, when her crew transferred to HMS Landrail, while Circe went to Govan to be fitted with new engines and boilers.

On 21 August 1905, Circe, which was stationed at Falmouth, was carrying out a fisheries protection patrol to guard against French vessels fishing in British waters when she encountered a group of French boats crab fishing off Eddystone Rocks. While most of the boats fled, Circe stopped two of them, the St. Jean and Christophe, after firing a shot across their bows, and brought them into Plymouth, although they were later released without charge. Circe was laid up in reserve at Devonport in 1906, and in 1907 recommissioned, joining the Home Fleet. On 30 April 1908 Circe, together with sister ship Hebe, several submarines and the submarine depot ship Forth left Devonport for a cruise to Falmouth. When B8 suffered problems in her propeller shaft bearings, Circe towed the disabled submarine back to Devonport.

In 1909 Circe was converted to a minesweeper, which involved removing the torpedo tubes. In June 1909 Circe took part in the Fleet manoeuvres.

On the outbreak of the First World War Circe joined the newly established Grand Fleet. In August 1914, the minesweepers attached to the Grand Fleet, including Circe, were employed on carrying out daily sweeps of the Pentland Firth.

On 22 October 1914, as a result of several suspected sightings of submarines in the main fleet anchorage of Scapa Flow, the 1st and 4th Battle Squadrons of the Grand Fleet moved to Lough Swilly on the east coast of Northern Ireland, which was considered more secure against submarine attack. On 27 October, the battleship Audacious struck a mine off Tory Island, north-west of Lough Swilly, and despite efforts to tow her to safety, sank later that day. Circe, which along with sister ship Leda was already at Lough Swilly, was used to clear a safe channel through the minefield.

On 18 November 1914 Circe and the gunboat Skipjack were about to start a minesweeping run in the channel between Fair Island and North Ronaldsay when Skipjack's commanding officer sighted the conning tower of the German submarine U-22. The two gunboats set off at full speed in pursuit, but the submarine outpaced them and dived to safety after a chase of 45 minutes. On 16 July 1915, Circe and the gunboats Gossamer and Speedwell were on the way from Scapa Flow to carry out an anti-submarine patrol off Muckle Flugga when Speedwell spotted the German submarine U-41 250 yards (230 m) off her port bow. Speedwell rammed the submarine, which turned over onto her side before disappearing. U-41 had both periscopes damaged and was forced to abort her patrol and return to home.

Circe was a member of the Second Fleet Sweeping Flotilla, based at Scapa Flow as part of the Grand Fleet, in July 1917. Circe was sold for scrap on 30 July 1920 to H Auten.

== Pennant numbers ==
Pennant number	From	To
D81	1914	September 1915
N81	September 1915	January 1918
N26	January 1918	-

== Bibliography ==
- Brassey, T. A., ed. (1895). The Naval Annual 1895. Portsmouth, UK: J Griffin and Co.
- Brassey, T. A., ed. (1897). The Naval Annual 1897. Portsmouth, UK: J Griffin and Co.
- Brassey, T. A., ed. (1898). The Naval Annual 1898. Portsmouth, UK: J Griffin and Co.
- Brassey, T. A., ed. (1902). The Naval Annual 1902. Portsmouth, UK: J Griffin and Co.
- Brassey, T. A., ed. (1905). The Naval Annual 1905. Portsmouth, UK: J Griffin and Co.
- Brown, Les (2023). Royal Navy Torpedo Vessels. Barnsley, UK: Seaforth Publishing. ISBN 978-1-3990-2285-9.
- Colledge, J. J.; Warlow, Ben (2006). ships of the Royal Navy: The Complete Record of all Fighting Ships of the Royal Navy from the 15th Century to the Present. London: Chatham Publishing. ISBN 9781861762818.
- Chesneau, Roger; Kolesnik, Eugene M., eds. (1979). Conway's All the World's Fighting Ships 1860–1905. London: Conway Maritime Press. ISBN 0-85177-133-5.
- Dittmar, F. J.; Colledge, J. J. (1972). British Warships 1914–1919. Shepperton, UK: Ian Allan. ISBN 0-7110-0380-7.
- Friedman, Norman (2009). British Destroyers: From Earliest Days to the Second World War. Barnsley, UK: Seaforth Publishing. ISBN 978-1-84832-049-9.
- Gardiner, Robert; Gray, Randal, eds. (1985). Conway's All The World's Fighting Ships 1906–1921. London: Conway Maritime Press. ISBN 0-85177-245-5.
- Jellicoe, John (1919). The Grand Fleet 1914–1916: Its Creation, Development and Work. London: Cassell & Company.
- Leyland, John, ed. (1901). The Naval Annual 1901. Portsmouth, UK: J Griffin and Co.
- Massie, Robert K. (2007). Castles of Steel: Britain, Germany and the Winning of the Great War at Sea. London: Vintage Books. ISBN 978-0-099-52378-9.
- Monograph No. 23: Home Waters Part I: From the Outbreak of War to 27 August 1914 (PDF). Naval Staff Monographs (Historical). Vol. X. Naval Staff, Training and Staff Duties Division. 1924.
- Monograph No. 24: Home Waters Part II: September and October 1914 (PDF). Naval Staff Monographs (Historical). Vol. XI. Naval Staff, Training and Staff Duties Division. 1924.
- Monograph No. 28: Home Waters Part III: From November 1914 to the end of January 1915 (PDF). Naval Staff Monographs (Historical). Vol. XII. Naval Staff, Training and Staff Duties Division. 1925.
- Monograph No. 30: Home Waters Part V: From July to October 1915 (PDF). Naval Staff Monographs (Historical). Vol. XIV. Naval Staff, Training and Staff Duties Division. 1926.
- Monograph No. 35: Home Waters Part IX: 1st May 1917 to 31st July 1917 (PDF). Naval Staff Monographs (Historical). Vol. XIX. Naval Staff, Training and Staff Duties Division. 1939.
- Moore, John (1990). Jane's Fighting Ships of World War I. London: Studio Editions. ISBN 1-85170-378-0.
