= HMS Rattlesnake (1886) =

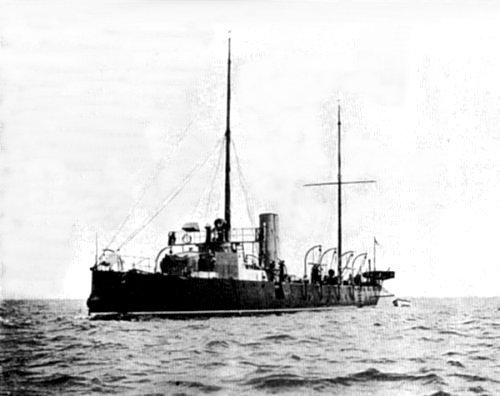
- Rattlesnake lowering boats

History

United Kingdom
- Name: Rattlesnake
- Ordered: 1885
- Builder: Laird Brothers, Birkenhead
- Yard number: 537
- Laid down: 16 November 1885
- Launched: 11 September 1886
- Commissioned: May 1887
- Fate: Sold in 1910

General characteristics
- Class & type: Torpedo gunboat
- Displacement: 550 long tons (559 t)
- Length: 200 ft (61 m) pp
- Beam: 23 ft (7 m)
- Depth of hold: 10 ft 2 in (3.1 m)
- Installed power: Locomotive boilers; 1,600 ihp (1,200 kW) (natural draught); 2,700 ihp (2,000 kW) (forced draught)
- Propulsion: 2 screws; 2 triple-expansion steam engines
- Speed: 16 3/4 knots (31 km/h; 19 mph) (natural draught); 19 1/4 knots (36 km/h; 22 mph) (forced draught)
- Range: 2,800 nmi (5,200 km; 3,200 mi) at 10 knots (19 km/h; 12 mph)
- Complement: 66
- Armament: 1 × 4-inch/25pdr BL gun; 6 × 3-pdr guns; 4 × 14 in (356 mm) torpedoes
- Armour: Deck (ship): 0.75 in (19 mm)

HMS Rattlesnake was a unique design of torpedo gunboat of the Royal Navy. A result of the Russian war scare of 1885, she was designed by Nathaniel Barnaby that year and built by Laird Brothers, of Birkenhead. Quickly made obsolete by the new torpedo boat destroyers, she became an experimental submarine target ship in 1906, and was sold in 1910.

== Design ==
Designed by Nathaniel Barnaby in 1885, Rattlesnake was, like the larger torpedo cruisers and the Curlew-class gunvessels, built in response to the Russian War scare. They were intended as a form of gunboat armed with torpedoes and designed for hunting and destroying smaller torpedo boats. By the end of the 1890s torpedo gunboats were superseded by their more successful contemporaries, the torpedo boat destroyers, and this quickly made Rattlesnake and her follow-on classes, the Grasshoppers, Sharpshooters, Alarms and Dryads, obsolete.

Exactly 200 feet (61 m) long and 23 feet (7.0 m) in beam, she displaced 550 tons. Built of steel, Rattlesnake was un-armoured with the exception of a 3/4-inch protective deck. She was armed with a single 4-inch/25-pounder breech-loading gun, six 3-pounder QF guns and four 14-inch (360 mm) torpedo tubes, arranged with two fixed tubes at the bow and a set of torpedo dropping carriages on either side. Four torpedo reloads were carried.

Propulsion was provided by two sets of Laird Brothers vertical triple-expansion steam engines, making her the first vessel in the Royal Navy to have such efficient engines. Steam was supplied from locomotive boilers and twin screws propelled her at up to 16 3/4 knots (31 km/h) on natural draught or 19 1/4 knots (36 km/h) with forced draught.

== Construction ==
Rattlesnake was laid down at Laird Brothers' Birkenhead yard as yard number 537 on 16 November 1885. She was launched on 11 September 1886, at a total cost of £21,425 for the hull and £14,000 for her machinery. She was commissioned for the first time in May 1887.

== Service history ==
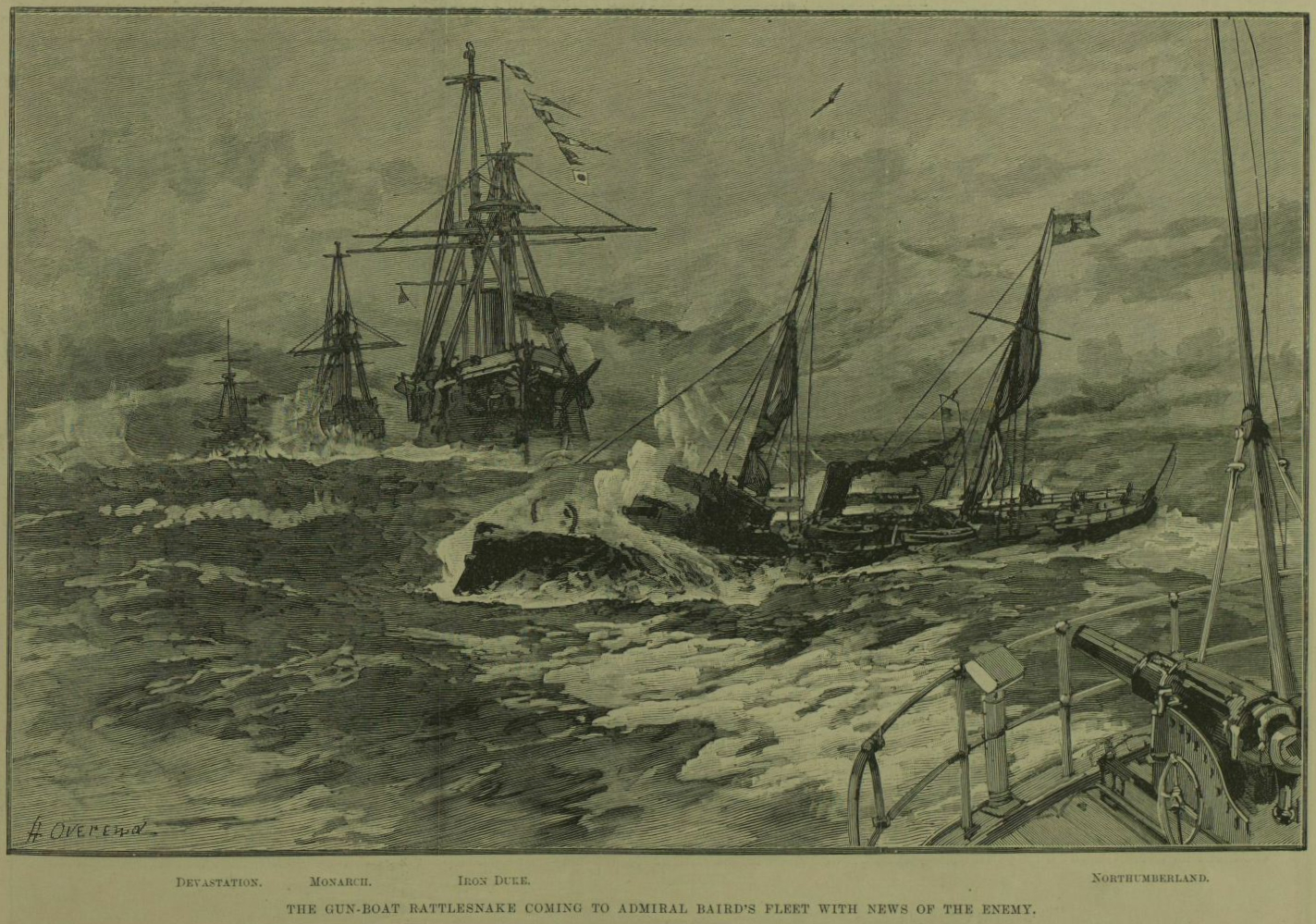
Rattlesnake coming to Admiral Baird's fleet with news of the enemy at the end of the 1889 naval manoeuvres

On 12 May 1887, the torpedo boat TB 47 suffered a burst steam pipe when carrying out a high-speed run between Portland and Torquay, badly scalding five of the torpedo boats crew. Rattlesnake and the coast guard tender Hind went to TB 47's assistance, with Rattlesnake taking the wounded on board and towing TB 47 back to Devonport. Three of the burned men died of their wounds. Rattlesnake took part in the 1893 British Naval Manoeuvres in the Irish Sea in late July–early August that year. Torpedo gunboats proved ineffective during the manoeuvres, although Rattlesnake was one of the few torpedo gunboats that were considered capable of fulfilling the role of opposing enemy torpedo boats. During the manoeuvres, Rattlesnake claimed three torpedo boats of the opposing force "sunk" although the exercise referees only awarded one of the claims. She was present on 26 June 1897 at the Naval Review at Spithead in celebration of Queen Victoria's Diamond Jubilee. In August 1902 she was reported to unship her gun mountings to become tender to HMS Narcissus, instructional cruiser to the gunnery school at Portsmouth. She became an experimental submarine target ship in 1906, and was sold in 1910.

== See also ==
- List of gunboat and gunvessel classes of the Royal Navy
