= Grasshopper-class torpedo gunboat =

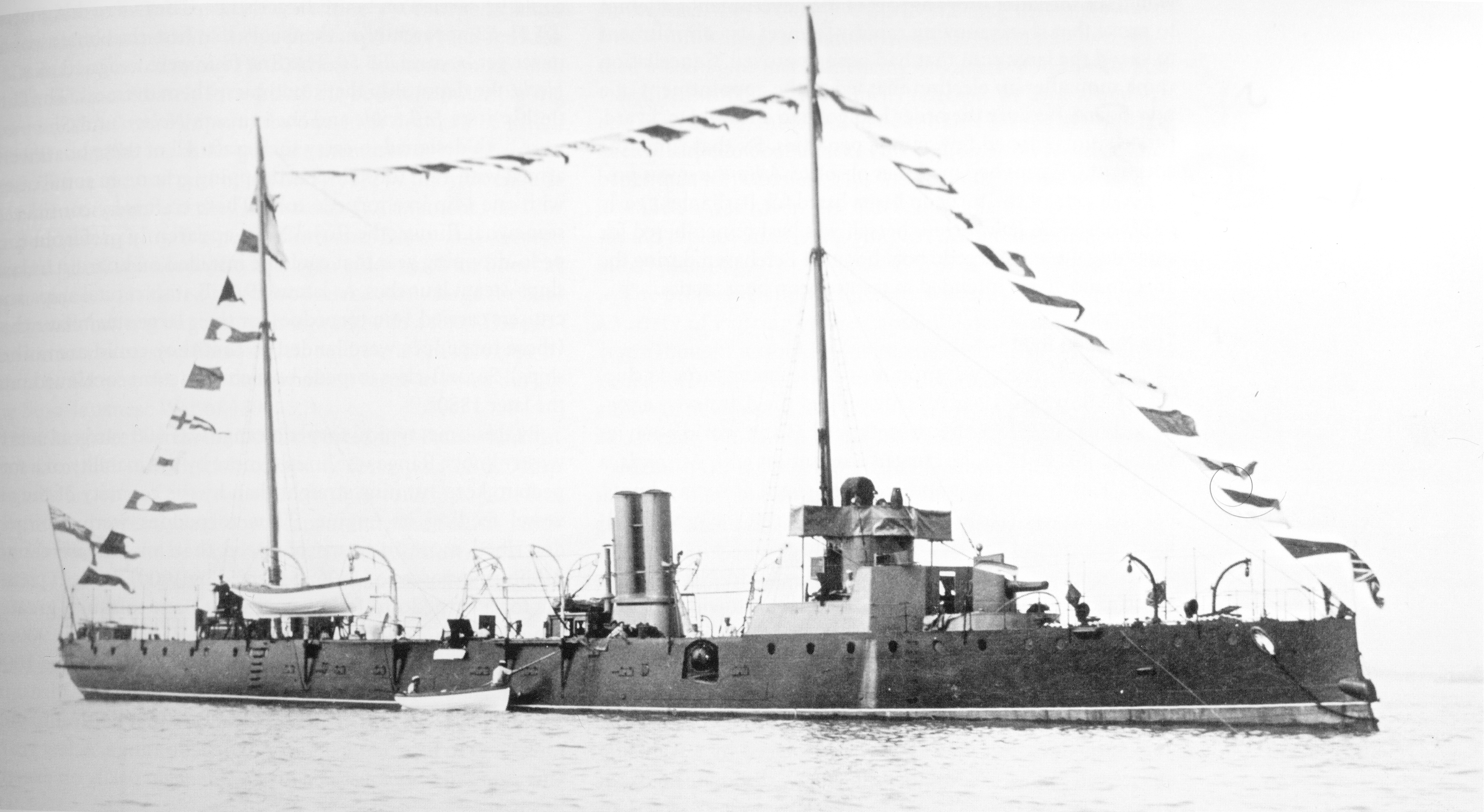
- Spider

Class overview
- Name: Grasshopper-class torpedo gunboat
- Builders: Devonport Dockyard; Sheerness Dockyard
- Operators: Royal Navy
- Preceded by: HMS Rattlesnake (1886)
- Succeeded by: Sharpshooter class
- Built: 1886–1888
- In commission: 1888–1905
- Completed: 3
- Lost: 0
- Scrapped: 3

General characteristics
- Type: Torpedo gunboat
- Displacement: 525 long tons (533 t)
- Length: 200 ft (61 m) (pp)
- Beam: 23 ft (7.0 m)
- Draught: 8 ft 9 in (2.67 m)
- Installed power: 2 Locomotive boilers; 1,600 ihp (1,200 kW) (natural draught); 2,700 ihp (2,000 kW) (forced draught)
- Propulsion: 2 screws; 2 × triple-expansion steam engines
- Speed: 19.25 knots (35.65 km/h; 22.15 mph)
- Range: 2,400 nmi (4,400 km; 2,800 mi) at 10 knots (19 km/h; 12 mph)
- Complement: 66
- Armament: 2 × 14 in (356 mm) torpedo tubes; 2 × 14 in (356 mm) torpedo carriages; 1 × 4 in (102 mm) gun; 6 × 3-pounder guns

The Grasshopper-class torpedo gunboat was a class of torpedo gunboat built for the Royal Navy in the late 19th century. All three ships were scrapped before World War I.

== Design ==
The Grasshopper class was designed by Nathaniel Barnaby in 1886 and were essentially repeats of the Rattlesnake of 1886. They had a length between perpendiculars of 200 ft (61 m), a beam of 23 ft (7.0 m) and a displacement of 525 long tons (533 t). They were engined with two sets of Maudslay, Sons & Field triple-expansion steam engines, two locomotive boilers, and twin screws. This layout produced 1,600 indicated horsepower (1,200 kW) with natural draught and 2,700 indicated horsepower (2,000 kW) with forced draught, giving them a top speed of 19.25 knots (35.65 km/h; 22.15 mph). They carried 100 tons of coal, giving them a range of about 2,400 nautical miles (4,400 km; 2,800 mi) at 10 knots (19 km/h; 12 mph) and were manned by 66 sailors and officers.

== Armament ==
The class was each fitted with one 4 inch Gun and six 3-pounder guns. Two 14-inch (356 mm) torpedo tubes and two additional 14-inch torpedo carriages. 4 reload torpedoes were carried.

== Ships ==
Name	Ship builder	Laid down	Launched	Completed	Fate
Grasshopper	Sheerness Dockyard	27 April 1886	30 August 1887	July 1888	Sold for breaking on 11 July 1905.
Sandfly	Devonport Dockyard	19 April 1886	20 September 1887	July 1888	Sold at Malta for breaking on 17 March 1905.
Spider	Devonport Dockyard	9 June 1886	17 October 1887	December 1888	Sold at Malta for breaking on 13 May 1903.

== See also ==
- List of torpedo gunboats of the Royal Navy

== Bibliography ==
- Brown, Les (2023). Royal Navy Torpedo Vessels. Barnsley, UK: Seaforth Publishing. ISBN 978-1-3990-2285-9.
- Colledge, J. J.; Warlow, Ben (2006) [1969]. Ships of the Royal Navy: The Complete Record of All Fighting Ships of the Royal Navy from the 15th Century to the Present (3rd Rev ed.). London: Chatham Publishing. ISBN 978-1-86176-281-8. OCLC 67375475.
- Lyon, David & Winfield, Rif (2004). The Sail and Steam Navy List: All the Ships of the Royal Navy 1815–1889. Chatham Publishing. ISBN 978-1-86176-032-6. OCLC 52620555.
