= Sharpshooter-class torpedo gunboat =

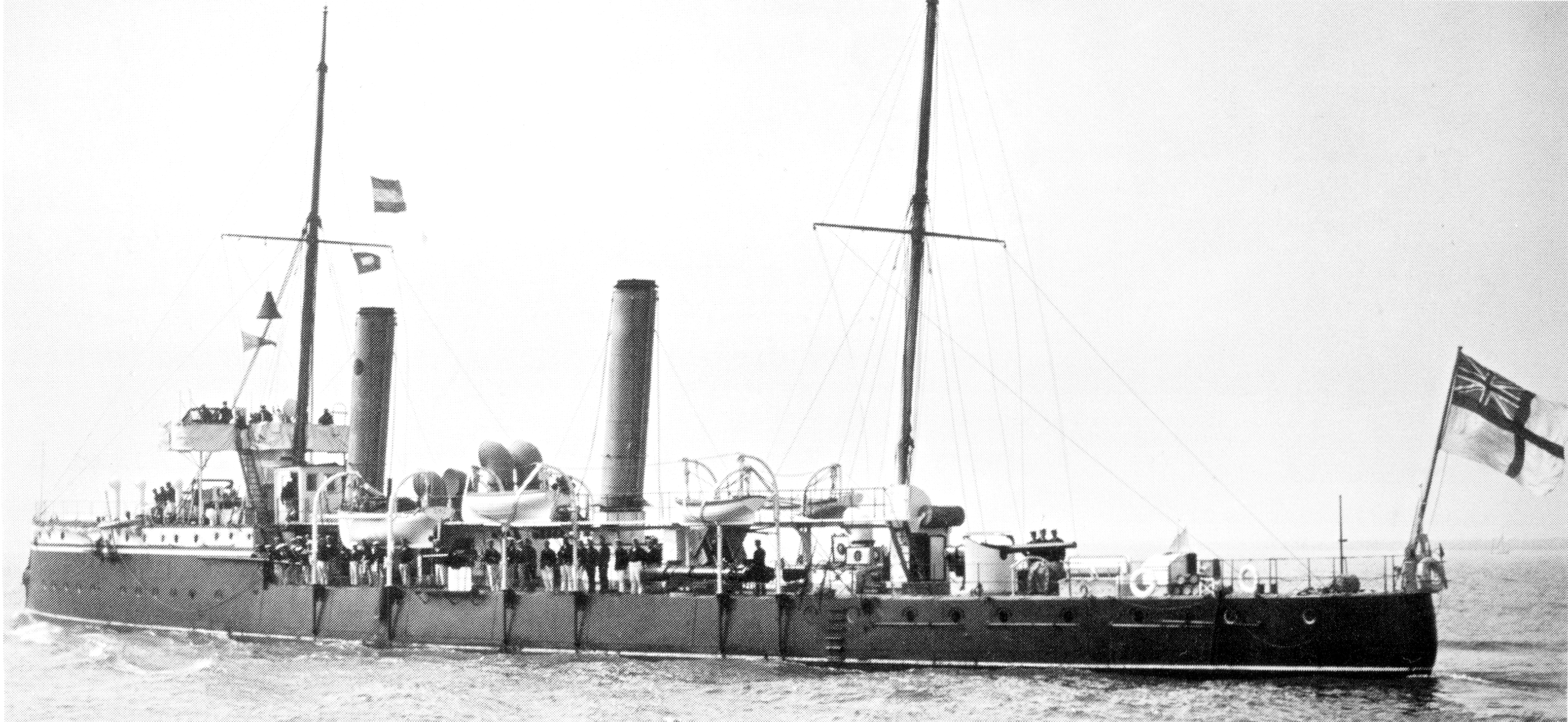
- HMS Spanker

Class overview
- Name: Sharpshooter-class torpedo gunboat
- Builders: Devonport Dockyard; Chatham Dockyard; Armstrong Mitchell, Elswick; Sheerness Dockyard
- Operators: Royal Navy
- Preceded by: Grasshopper class
- Succeeded by: Alarm class
- Subclasses: Almirante Lynch class
- Built: 1888–1891
- In commission: 1889–1922
- Completed: 13
- Lost: 1
- Scrapped: 12

General characteristics
- Type: Torpedo gunboat
- Displacement: 735 tons
- Length: 242 ft (74 m) oa, 230 ft (70 m) pp
- Beam: 27 ft (8.2 m)
- Draught: 8 ft 6 in (2.59 m)
- Installed power: 2,500 ihp (1,900 kW) (natural draught); 3,600 ihp (2,700 kW) (forced draught)
- Propulsion: 2 × Belliss and Morcom triple-expansion steam engines; Locomotive boilers; Twin screws; (later re-boilered with water-tube boilers)
- Speed: 19 kn (35 km/h)
- Range: 2,500 nmi (4,600 km) at 10 kn (19 km/h)
- Complement: 91
- Armament: 5 × 14-inch (360 mm) torpedo tubes (3 reloads); 2 × QF 4.7-inch (12 cm) guns; 4 × 3-pounder guns; Except Plassey & Assaye: 3 × 14-inch (360 mm) torpedo tubes (3 reloads); 2 × QF 4.7-inch (12 cm) guns; 4 × 3-pounder guns

The Sharpshooter-class torpedo gunboat was a class of torpedo gunboat built for the Royal Navy in the late 19th century. One of the class was hulked in 1904, seven were scrapped before World War I and five were converted to minesweepers. Of these minesweepers, Seagull was lost to a collision in 1918 and the rest survived the war to be broken up in the early 1920s.

== Design ==
The Sharpshooter class was designed by Sir William White in 1888. They had a length overall of 242 ft (74 m), a beam of 27 ft (8.2 m) and a displacement of 735 tons. They were engined with two sets of Belliss and Morcom triple-expansion steam engines, two locomotive-type boilers, and twin screws. This layout produced 2,500 indicated horsepower (1,900 kW) with natural draught and 3,600 indicated horsepower (2,700 kW) with forced draught, giving them a top speed of 19 knots (35 km/h). They carried 100 tons of coal, giving them a range of about 2,500 nautical miles (4,600 km) at 10 knots (19 km/h) and were manned by 91 sailors and officers. The following Alarm class were essentially an enlarged version of the Sharpshooters.

From 1895 to 1898 a series of different boilers were fitted to Sharpshooter, Sheldrake, Seagull, Spanker and Salamander.

== Armament ==
At build the class was fitted with two QF 4.7-inch (12 cm)/45-pounder guns and four 3-pounder guns. Five 14-inch (360 mm) torpedo tubes were fitted, except in Plassey and Assaye, which had three tubes. Three reloads were provided.

Those vessels converted to minesweepers in 1909 retained their guns and had a kite winch and gallows fitted on the quarterdeck.

== Service ==
Plassey and Assaye were built for the Bombay Marine (renamed the Royal Indian Marine in 1892). Whiting and Wizard (renamed Boomerang and Karakatta before commissioning) were assigned to the Australia Station. Seven of the class, including all the colonial service boats, were sold for breaking in 1904 - 1907, and five of the class were converted to minesweepers in 1908 - 1909. Of the five minesweepers, Seagull was lost in a collision with SS Corrib in the Clyde in 1918, and the others were sold for breaking after World War I. Sharpshooter was hulked for instructional duties in 1904 and renamed Northampton, surviving until 1922 until being sold for breaking.

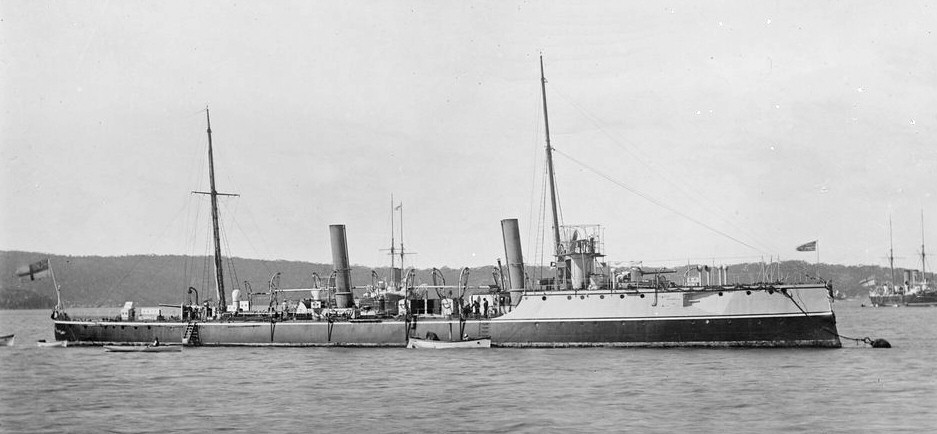
HMS Boomerang

== Ships ==
Name	Ship builder	Laid down	Launched	Completed	Fate
Sharpshooter	Devonport Dockyard	13 January 1888	30 November 1888	August 1889	Hulked for instructional duties, renamed Northampton in 1904 (or later) and berthed in central London. Transferred in 1919 to the Sea Scouts, she was sold for breaking up on 27 March 1922
Spanker	Devonport Dockyard	12 April 1888	22 February 1889	17 October 1890	Became a minesweeper in 1909. Sold for breaking on 20 March 1920
Speedwell	Devonport Dockyard	18 April 1888	15 March 1889	1 July 1890	Became a minesweeper in 1909. Sold for breaking on 20 March 1920
Salamander	Chatham Dockyard	23 April 1888	31 May 1889	8 July 1891	Sold for breaking on 15 May 1906
Seagull	Chatham Dockyard	23 April 1888	31 May 1889	1 December 1890	Became a minesweeper in 1909. Sunk in a collision in the Firth of Clyde on 30 September 1918
Sheldrake	Chatham Dockyard	4 July 1888	30 March 1889	18 March 1890	Sold for breaking on 9 July 1907
Skipjack	Chatham Dockyard	4 July 1888	30 April 1889	14 February 1891	Became a minesweeper in 1909. Sold for breaking on 23 April 1920
Boomerang	Armstrong Mitchell, Elswick	17 August 1888	24 July 1889	14 February 1891	Laid down as Whiting, renamed Boomerang on 2 April 1890. Sold at Portsmouth on 11 July 1905
Karakatta	Armstrong Mitchell, Elswick	17 August 1888	27 August 1889	14 February 1891	Laid down as Wizard, renamed Karakatta on 2 April 1890. Sold at Portsmouth on 11 January 1905
Assaye	Armstrong Mitchell, Elswick	19 November 1888	11 February 1890	January 1892	Built for the Royal Indian Marine. Sold in May 1904
Plassey	Armstrong Mitchell, Elswick	19 November 1888	5 July 1890	February 1892	Built for the Royal Indian Marine. Sold on 17 May 1904
Gossamer	Sheerness Dockyard	21 January 1889	9 January 1890	16 June 1891	Became a minesweeper in 1908. Sold for breaking on 20 March 1920
Gleaner	Sheerness Dockyard	21 January 1889	9 January 1890	21 December 1891	Sold for breaking on 4 April 1905

== See also ==
- List of torpedo gunboats of the Royal Navy

== Bibliography ==
- Brown, Les (2023). Royal Navy Torpedo Vessels. Barnsley, UK: Seaforth Publishing. ISBN 978-1-3990-2285-9.
- Colledge, J. J.; Warlow, Ben (2006) [1969]. Ships of the Royal Navy: The Complete Record of All Fighting Ships of the Royal Navy from the 15th Century to the Present (3rd Rev ed.). London: Chatham Publishing. ISBN 978-1-86176-281-8. OCLC 67375475.
- Lyon, David & Winfield, Rif (2004). The Sail and Steam Navy List: All the Ships of the Royal Navy 1815–1889. Chatham Publishing. ISBN 978-1-86176-032-6. OCLC 52620555.
