= Torpedo gunboat =

Late 19th century naval ship type

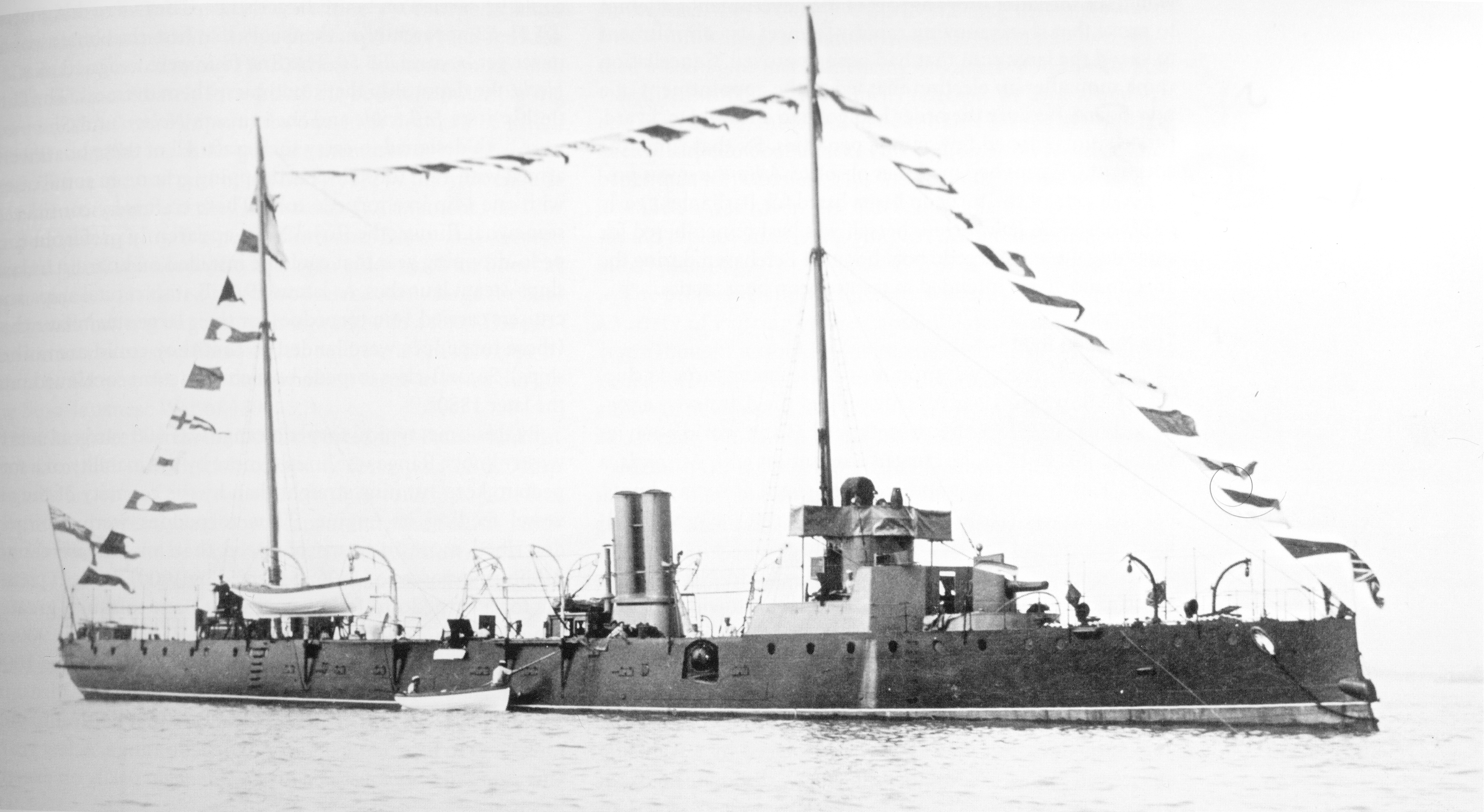
HMS Spider, an early model of torpedo gunboat

In the late 19th century, torpedo gunboats were a form of gunboat armed with torpedoes and designed for hunting and destroying smaller torpedo boats. By the end of the 1890s torpedo gunboats were superseded by their more successful contemporaries, the torpedo boat destroyers.

== History ==
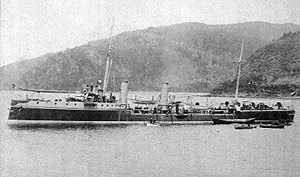
Chilean torpedo gunboat Almirante Lynch

A number of torpedo gunboats, the prototype Rattlesnake of 1886 followed by the Grasshopper class (of 3 vessels), the Sharpshooter class (13 vessels), the Alarm class (11 vessels) and the Dryad class (5 vessels), were built for the Royal Navy during the 1880s and the 1890s; similar vessels were also constructed or otherwise acquired by a number of European nations and Japan. Essentially very small cruisers, torpedo gunboats were typically fitted with locomotive boilers and were equipped with torpedo tubes and an adequate gun armament, intended for hunting down smaller enemy torpedo boats. In practice they failed in their primary objective, as they were not fast enough to keep up with torpedo boats, and their role was quickly taken over by the faster torpedo boat destroyers. One of the faster torpedo gunboats was the Spanish warship Destructor, commissioned in 1887, and considered by some sources the first torpedo boat destroyer.

The Chilean Navy ordered in the late 1880s, at the Laird Brothers shipyard, the first ships of this type, a subclass of the Sharpshooter class, the Almirante Lynch class which were the Almirante Lynch and Almirante Condell. These two ships participated in the Battle of Caldera Bay during the Chilean Civil War of 1891, where Almirante Lynch managed to sink the ironclad Blanco Encalada with a torpedo, showing the world that this type of ship could also destroy ironclad warships, and marking a milestone in naval history as it was the first time an ironclad was sunk with self-propelled torpedoes. In 1896, the Chilean Navy acquired a third ship of this type from the same shipyard, the Almirante Simpson torpedo gunboat.

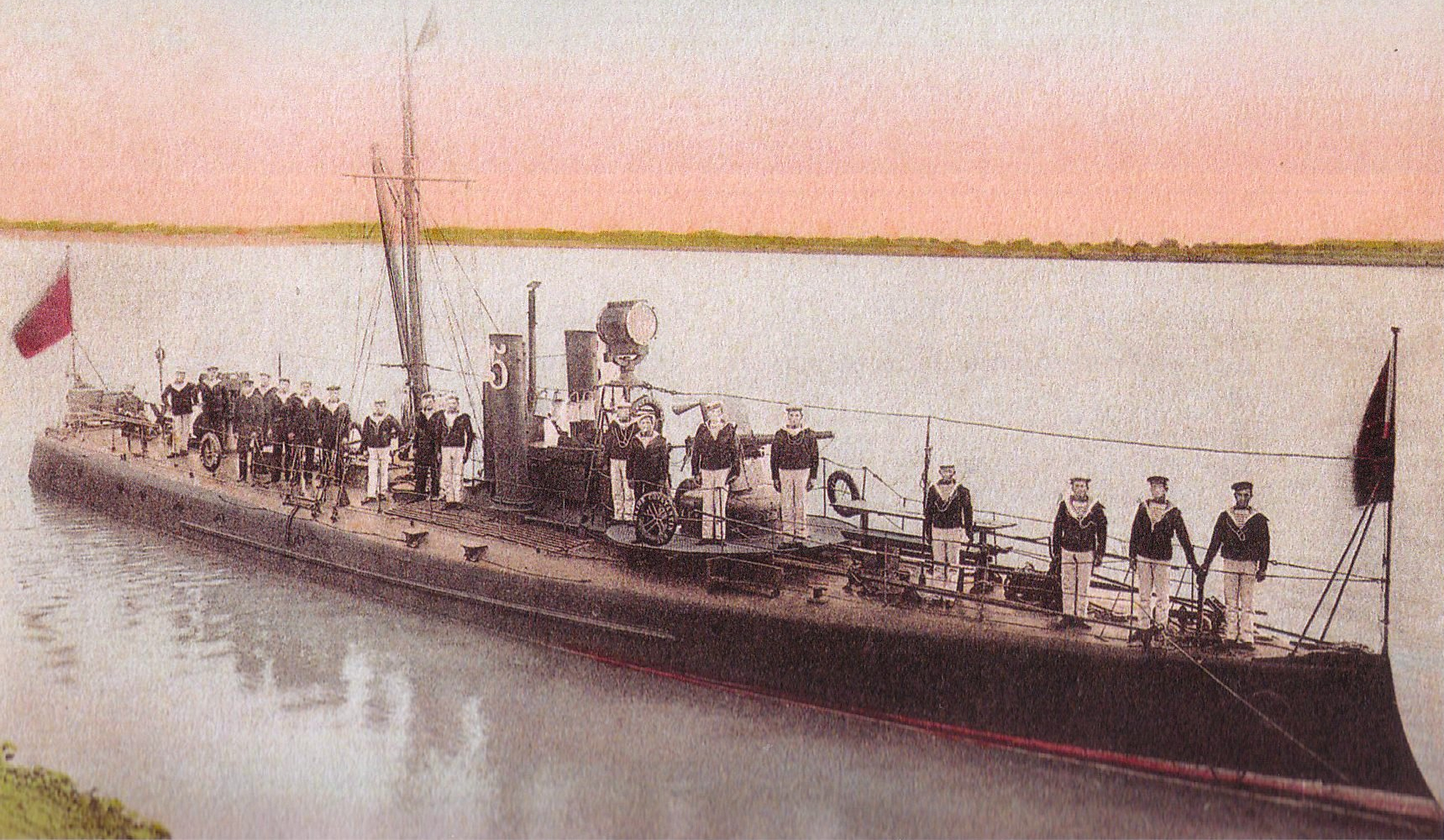
Romanian river torpedo gunboat

Between 1906 and 1907, Romania ordered and commissioned a class of eight British-built torpedo gunboats for its Danube Flotilla. These 50-ton vessels were much smaller than their sea-going counterparts but were well-armed for their size: in addition to one 47 mm naval gun and one 6.5 mm machine gun, each boat also carried 4 torpedoes: two on spars in front of the vessel and two more amidships in torpedo dropping gear (carriages). The boats were also armored, having bulletproof sides and deck. Their maximum speed amounted of 18 knots. Despite being built for Danubian service, the vessels of this class were nonetheless seaworthy as well, three being incorporated into the Soviet Black Sea Fleet in August 1944 (returned to Romania in September 1945).

Perhaps the last torpedo gunboat ever built was the Uruguay, constructed to order in Germany for the Uruguayan navy, with whom she served from August 1910 until 1951. Contrary to the depiction in the film The Battle of the River Plate, she did not participate in the boarding of the German freighter Tacoma in the aftermath of the battle.

== See also ==
- Royal Navy gunboats
- Torpedo cruiser
