= Dryad-class torpedo gunboat =

1894 class of British torpedo gunboats

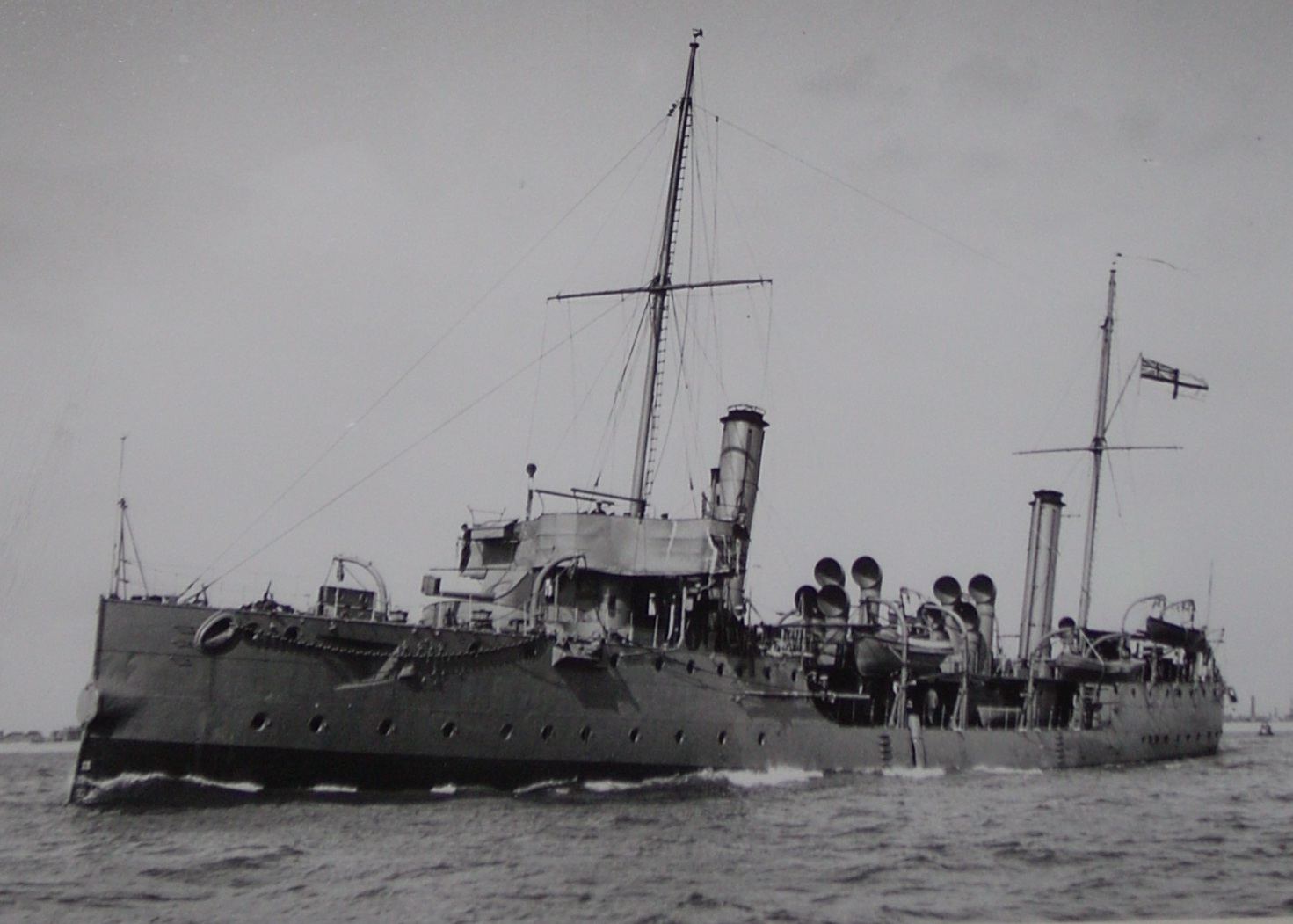
- Dryad underway in wartime grey paint

Class overview
- Builders: Pembroke, Devonport & Chatham dockyards
- Operators: Royal Navy
- Preceded by: Alarm class
- Succeeded by: None
- Built: 1893–1894
- In commission: 1894–1921
- Completed: 5
- Lost: 1
- Scrapped: 4

General characteristics
- Type: Torpedo gunboat
- Displacement: 1070 tons
- Length: 262 ft 6 in (80.0 m)
- Beam: 30 ft 6 in (9.3 m)
- Draught: 13 ft (4.0 m)
- Installed power: 3,500 ihp (2,600 kW); Halcyon: 6,000 ihp (4,500 kW)
- Propulsion: 2 × 3-cylinder vertical triple-expansion steam engines; Locomotive boilers; Twin screws
- Speed: 18.2 kn (33.7 km/h)
- Complement: 120
- Armament: 2 × QF 4.7-inch (12 cm) guns; 4 × 6-pounder; 1 × Nordenfelt machine gun; 5 × 18-inch torpedo tubes; Hussar as built: 1 × QF 4.7-inch (12 cm) guns; 2 × 12-pounder guns; 1 × 6-pounder gun; 5 × 18-inch torpedo tubes

The Dryad-class torpedo gunboat was the last class of torpedo gunboat built for the Royal Navy. This type of vessel was rapidly replaced by the faster torpedo boat destroyer, and all of the class were converted to minesweepers during World War I, with the exception of Hazard, which became a submarine depot ship.

== Design ==
Ordered under the Naval Defence Act of 1889, which established the "Two-Power Standard", the ships were contemporary with the first torpedo boat destroyers, a type which subsequently superseded the torpedo gunboats. With a length overall of 262 ft 6 in (80.01 m), a beam of 30 ft 6 in (9.30 m) and a displacement of 1,070 tons, these torpedo gunboats were not small ships by the standard of the time; they were larger than the majority of World War I destroyers.

=== Machinery ===
They were equipped with two sets of vertical triple-expansion steam engines, with two locomotive-type boilers, driving through twin screws. This layout produced 3,500 indicated horsepower (2,600 kW) giving them a speed of 18.2 knots (33.7 km/h); Halcyon was uprated to produce 6000 ihp, giving her a speed of approximately 20 knots (37 km/h). They carried between 100 and 160 tons of coal and were manned by 120 sailors and officers.

=== Armament ===
The armament when built comprised two QF 4.7-inch (12 cm) guns, four 6-pounder guns and a single 5-barrelled Nordenfelt machine gun. Hussar as built mounted only one QF 4.7-inch gun, two 12-pounders and one 6-pounder. The primary weapon was five 18-inch (450-mm) torpedo tubes, (Note: British "18 inch" torpedoes were 17.72 inches (45.0 cm) in diameter) with two reloads. On conversion to minesweepers in 1914 two of the five torpedoes were removed.

== Ships ==
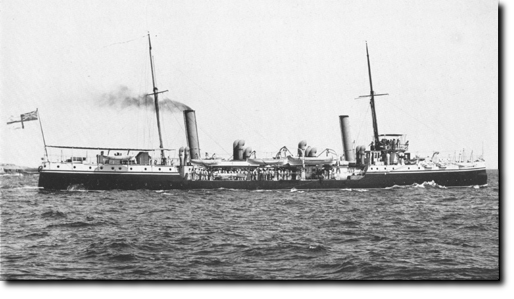
Hussar

Name	Ship Builder	Launched	Fate
Dryad	Chatham Dockyard	22 November 1893	Tender to the Navigation School in 1906. Became a minesweeper in 1914. Relegated to harbour service and renamed Hamadryad in January 1918. Sold for breaking on 24 September 1920
Hazard	Pembroke Dockyard	17 February 1894	Depot ship for submarines in 1901. Collided with the submerged submarine HMS A3 on 2 February 1912, killing 14 submariners. Sank in collision with the Western Australia in the English Channel on 28 January 1918
Harrier	Devonport Dockyard	20 February 1894	Became a minesweeper in 1914. Sold for breaking on 23 February 1920
Halcyon	Devonport Dockyard	6 April 1894	Transferred to HM Coastguard in 1905. Became a minesweeper in 1914. Sold for breaking on 6 November 1919
Hussar	Devonport Dockyard	3 July 1894	Became a minesweeper in 1914. Sold in December 1920 and resold for breaking on 13 July 1921

== See also ==
- ARA Patria

== Bibliography ==
- Brown, Les (2023). Royal Navy Torpedo Vessels. Barnsley, UK: Seaforth Publishing. ISBN 978-1-3990-2285-9.
- Colledge, J. J.; Warlow, Ben (2006) [1969]. Ships of the Royal Navy: The Complete Record of All Fighting Ships of the Royal Navy from the 15th Century to the Present (3rd Rev ed.). London: Chatham Publishing. ISBN 978-1-86176-281-8. OCLC 67375475.
- Lyon, David & Winfield, Rif (2004). The Sail and Steam Navy List: All the Ships of the Royal Navy 1815–1889. Chatham Publishing. ISBN 978-1-86176-032-6. OCLC 52620555.
