= Russian battleship Imperator Nikolai I (1889) =

Russian Imperator Aleksandr II-class battleship

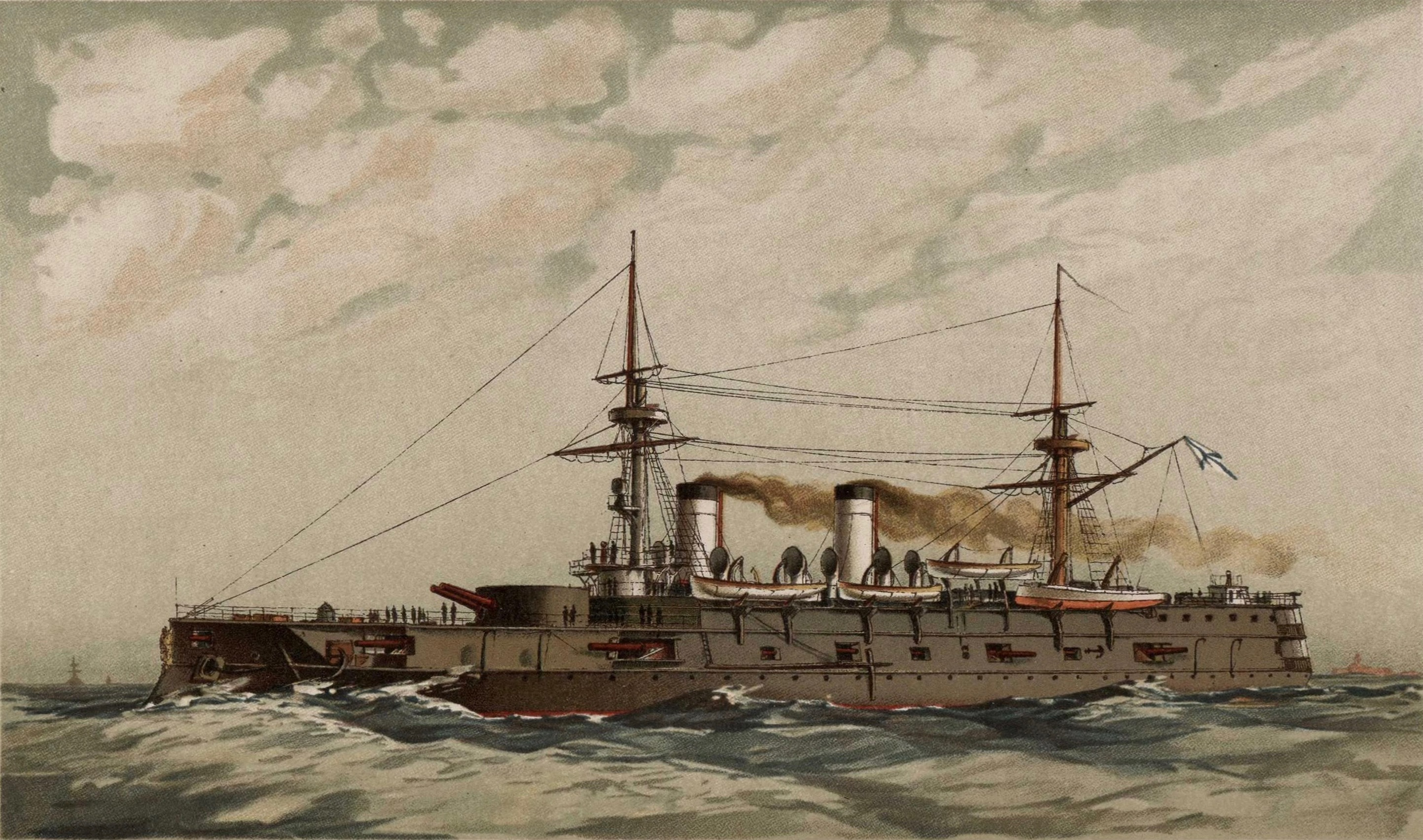
- Imperator Nikolai I as depicted by an 1893 lithograph

History

Russian Empire
- Name: Imperator Nikolai I
- Namesake: Nicholas I of Russia
- Ordered: 1 January 1886 (Note: All dates used in this article are New Style)
- Builder: Franco-Russian Works, Saint Petersburg
- Laid down: 4 August 1886
- Launched: 1 June 1889
- Commissioned: July 1891
- Fate: Captured by Japan, 28 May 1905

Japan
- Name: Iki
- Namesake: Iki province
- Acquired: 28 May 1905
- Commissioned: 6 June 1905
- Stricken: 1 May 1915
- Fate: Sunk as target, 3 October 1915

General characteristics
- Class & type: Imperator Aleksandr II-class battleship
- Displacement: 9,594 long tons (9,748 t)
- Length: 346 ft 6 in (105.61 m)
- Beam: 66 ft 11 in (20.40 m)
- Draft: 24 ft 3 in (7.39 m)
- Installed power: 12 cylindrical boilers; 7,842 ihp (5,848 kW)
- Propulsion: 2 shafts; 2 compound-expansion steam engines
- Speed: 14 knots (26 km/h; 16 mph)
- Range: 2,630 nautical miles (4,870 km; 3,030 mi) at 10 knots (19 km/h; 12 mph)
- Complement: 616
- Armament: As built: 1 × twin 12 in (305 mm) guns; 4 × single 9 in (229 mm) guns; 8 × single 6 in (152 mm) guns; 10 × single 47 mm (1.9 in) Hotchkiss revolving cannon; 8 × single 37 mm (1.5 in) Hotchkiss revolving cannon; 6 × single 15 in (381 mm) torpedo tubes; As Iki: 1 × twin 12 in (305 mm) guns; 6 × single 6 in (152 mm) guns; 6 × single 4.7 in (119 mm) guns; 6 × single 3 in (76 mm) guns; 6 × single 18 in (457 mm) torpedo tubes
- Armor: Compound armor; Belt: 6–14 in (152–356 mm); Deck: 2.5 in (64 mm); Turret: 10 in (254 mm); Conning tower: 6 in (152 mm); Bulkheads: 6 in (152 mm)

Imperator Nikolai I (Russian: Император Николай I) was a Russian Imperator Aleksandr II-class battleship built for the Baltic Fleet in the late 1880s. She participated in the celebration of the 400th anniversary of the discovery of America in New York City in 1892. She was assigned to the Mediterranean Squadron and visited Toulon in October 1893. She sailed for the Pacific Ocean during the First Sino-Japanese War and remained in the Pacific until late 1896, when she returned to the Mediterranean Squadron and supported Russian interests during the Cretan Revolt. She returned to the Baltic in April 1898 and had a lengthy refit, which replaced all of her machinery, before returning to the Mediterranean in 1901.

Returning to the Baltic during the Russo-Japanese War Imperator Nikolai I was refitted in late 1904 to serve as the flagship of the Third Pacific Squadron under Rear Admiral Nikolai Nebogatov. She was slightly damaged during the Battle of Tsushima and was surrendered, along with most of the Third Pacific Squadron, by Admiral Nebogatov to the Japanese the following day. She was taken into the Imperial Japanese Navy under the new name of Iki (壱岐) and she served as a gunnery training ship until 1910 and then became a first-class coast defense ship and training vessel. She was sunk as a target ship in October 1915.

== Development ==
Imperator Nikolai I was originally intended as a smaller ship than her half-sister Imperator Aleksandr II along the lines of the Brazilian battleship Riachuelo, but armed with 12-inch (305 mm) guns. A contract was signed on 6 November 1885 with the Baltic Works for a 7,572-long-ton (7,694 t) ship armed with two 12-inch guns in a forward barbette. However, this was quickly cancelled and a contract was quickly let with the Franco-Russian Works for a repeat of Imperator Aleksandr II even though the earlier ship had been built by the Baltic Works. The Franco-Russian Works had difficulties getting the drawings and was forced to redraft some of them. They took the opportunity to change the design in a number of relatively minor ways while doing so. However, the substitution of a gun turret for Imperator Aleksandr II's barbette mount was made in 1887, well after the start of construction and proved problematic. The design of the turret was not finalized until April 1889 and work on the forward part of the hull had to cease for more than six months because the dimensions of the turret were not yet known. The turret proved to be 44.9 long tons (46 t) heavier than the older ship's barbette and made Imperator Nikolai I slightly bow-heavy despite a reduction in the height of the belt armor in compensation.

== Description ==
Imperator Nikolai I was 333 feet 6 inches (101.65 m) long at the waterline and 346 feet 6 inches (106 m) long overall. She had a beam of 66 feet 11 inches (20 m) and a draft of 24 feet 3 inches (7.4 m), 1 foot 3 inches (0.4 m) more than designed. She displaced 9,594 long tons (9,748 t) at load, over 1,000 long tons (1,016 t) more than her designed displacement of 8,440 long tons (8,575 t).

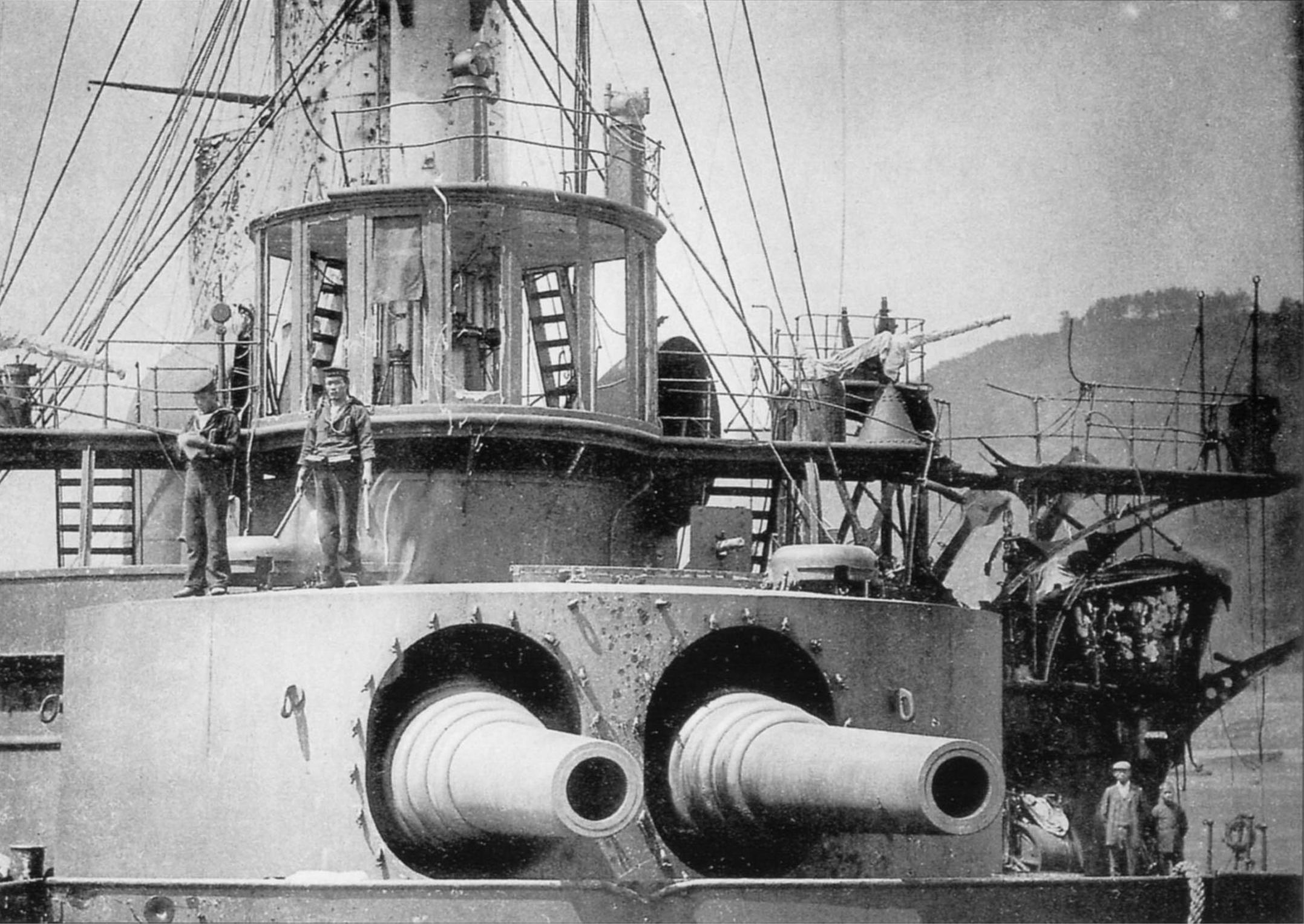
Imperator Nikolai I's forward turret and bridge shortly after Tsushima

Imperator Nikolai I had two triple-cylinder vertical compound steam engines, each driving a single propeller. Twelve cylindrical boilers provided non-superheated steam to the engines. They were built by Baltic Works and had a total designed output of 8,000 indicated horsepower (5,966 kW). On trials, the powerplant produced a total of 7,842 indicated horsepower (5,848 kW), and a top speed of 14 knots (26 km/h; 16 mph). She carried 847 long tons (861 t) of coal that gave her a range of 2,630 nautical miles (4,870 km; 3,030 mi) at a speed of 10 knots (19 km/h; 12 mph).

The main armament of the Imperator Aleksandr II-class ships was a pair of 12-inch (305 mm) Obukhov Model 1877 30-caliber guns. Imperator Nikolai I carried hers in a twin-gun turret forward. The four 9-inch (229 mm) Obukhov Model 1877 35-caliber guns were on center-pivot mounts in casemates at the corners of the citadel, the hull given a pronounced tumblehome to increase their arcs of fire ahead and behind. The eight 6-inch (152 mm) Model 1877 35-caliber guns were mounted on broadside pivot mounts. Four were fitted between the 9-inch guns and could traverse a total of 100°. The others were mounted at each end of the ship where they could fire directly ahead or astern. The ten 47-millimeter (1.9 in) Hotchkiss revolving cannon were mounted in hull embrasures of the ship, between the nine and six-inch guns to defend against torpedo boats. Four 37-millimeter (1.5 in) Hotchkiss revolving cannon were mounted in each fighting top. Imperator Nikolai I carried six above-water 15-inch (381 mm) torpedo tubes. One was in the bow, two tubes were on each broadside and a tube was in the stern.

Most of Imperator Nikolai I's armor was imported from the United Kingdom and some deliveries were delayed which caused problems during construction. The height of the waterline armor belt was reduced 6 inches (152 mm) in comparison to that of her half-sister, being 8 feet (2.4 m) tall, of which 3 feet (0.9 m) was above the designed waterline and 5 feet (1.5 m) below. Most of the rest of the protection matched that of Imperator Aleksandr II other than the waterline belt forward which only reduced to a minimum of six inches rather than the 3.9 inches (99 mm) of the older ship and the walls of the conning tower were only six inches thick, 2 inches (51 mm) less than her half-sister.

== History ==
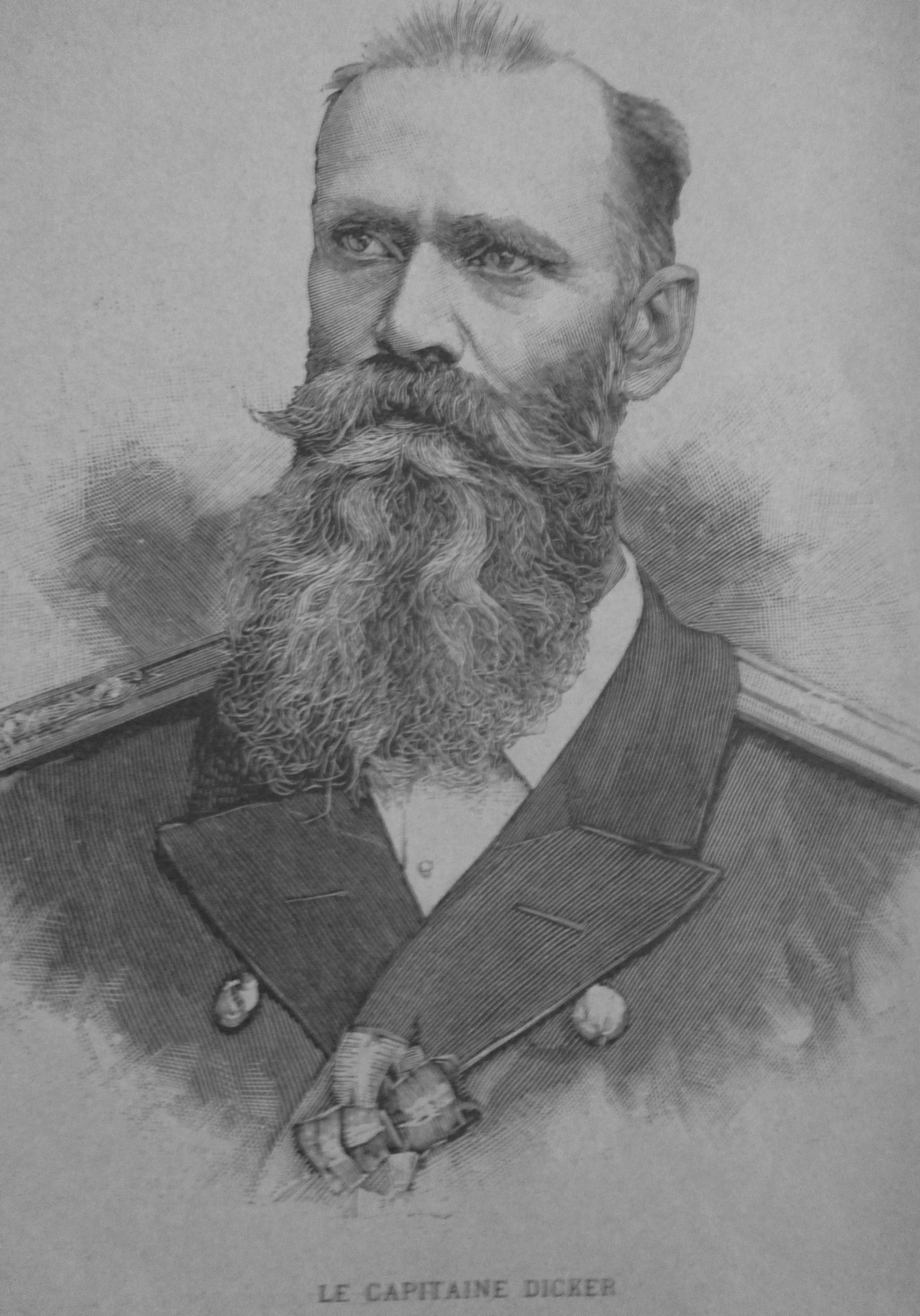
Captain Richard Romanovich Dicker (1847–1939).

Imperator Nikolai I was named after the Emperor Nicholas I of Russia. She was built by the Franco-Russian Works at Saint Petersburg. She was laid down on 4 August 1886, launched on 1 June 1889, and completed in July 1891, although her trials lasted until the spring of 1892. She sailed in June 1892 for New York City to participate in the celebration honoring the 400th anniversary of the discovery of America. Upon her departure she was assigned to the Mediterranean Squadron and visited Toulon in October 1893 with the Russian Squadron to reinforce the Franco-Russian Alliance. She was then commanded by Captain Richard Dicker. She sailed for the Pacific Ocean during the First Sino-Japanese War and arrived at Nagasaki, Japan on 28 April 1895, before sailing for Chefoo in China. She remained in the Pacific until late 1896, when she returned to the Mediterranean Squadron. While there, she operated as part of the International Squadron, a multinational force made up of ships of the Austro-Hungarian Navy, French Navy, Imperial German Navy, Italian Royal Navy (Regia Marina), Imperial Russian Navy, and British Royal Navy that intervened in the 1897–1898 Greek Christian uprising against the Ottoman Empire′s rule in Crete, and on 14 February 1897 she hosted the island′s Ottoman vali (governor), George Berovich (also known as Berovich Pasha), before he fled to Trieste with an Austrian steamer a couple of days later. She returned to the Baltic in April 1898 for an extensive, multi-year, refit. Her machinery was replaced with Belleville water-tube boilers and vertical triple expansion steam engines. Her after superstructure was cut down one deck abaft the mainmast and most of her 47 mm and 37 mm revolving cannon were removed. Only two 37 mm revolvers were retained and she received sixteen 47 mm and two 37 mm single-barreled guns in their place.

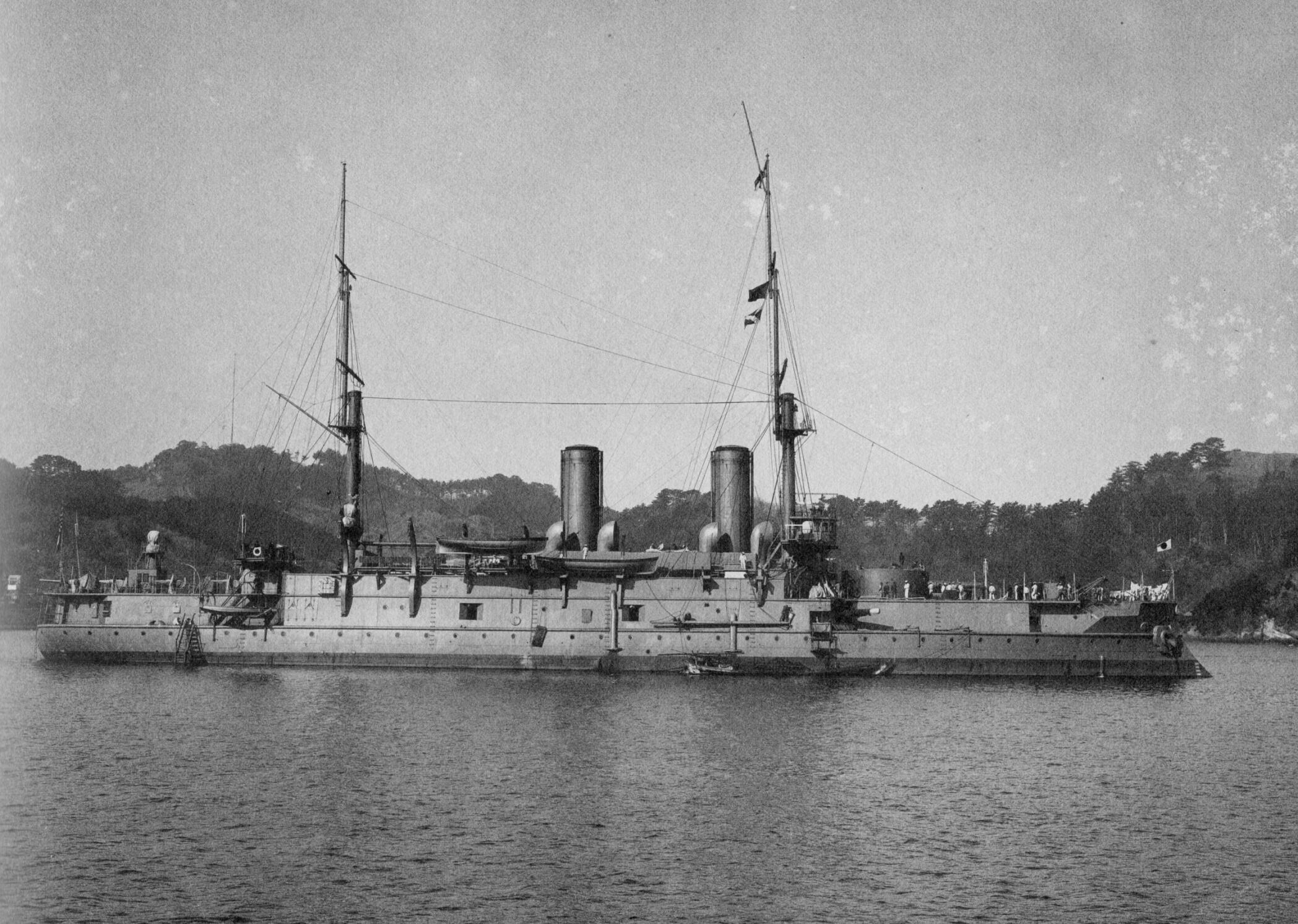
Iki at Yokosuka, 12 February 1906

Imperator Nikolai I returned to the Mediterranean in September 1901 and remained there until the Russo-Japanese War when she was transferred to the Baltic to be refitted in late 1904 to serve as the flagship of the Third Pacific Squadron under Rear Admiral Nikolai Nebogatov. The squadron departed Liepāja on 15 January 1905 for the Pacific. She was slightly damaged during the Battle of Tsushima, receiving one hit from a twelve-inch gun, two from eight-inch guns and two from six-inch guns, and suffered only 5 killed and 35 men wounded. The wounded included the ship’s Captain Vladimir Smirnov and Nebogatov took direct command of the ship. She was surrendered, along with most of the Third Pacific Squadron, by Admiral Nebogatov the following day.

== Japanese service ==
On 6 June 1905, she was taken into the Imperial Japanese Navy and renamed Iki, after Iki Island in the Sea of Japan, near the site of the Battle of Tsushima. She served as a gunnery training ship until 12 December 1910 when she was redesignated as a first-class coast defense ship and a training vessel. As Iki she was armed with her original 12-inch/30 caliber guns in a forward twin turret, six 6-inch/40 caliber Armstrong Pattern Z guns in single mounts, six 4.7-inch/40 caliber Armstrong Pattern T guns in single mounts, six 3-inch/40 caliber Armstrong N guns in single mounts and six 18-inch torpedoes. She was stricken 1 May 1915 and sunk as a target on 3 October 1915 by the battlecruisers Kongō and Hiei, although Watts and Gordon say that she was scrapped in 1922.

== See also ==
- List of battleships of Japan

== Bibliography ==
- Campbell, N. J. M. (1979). "Russia". In Chesneau, Roger & Kolesnik, Eugene M. (eds.). Conway's All the World's Fighting Ships 1860–1905. Greenwich: Conway Maritime Press. ISBN 0-8317-0302-4.
- Gibbs, Jay (2010). "Question 28/43: Japanese Ex-Naval Coast Defense Guns". Warship International. XLVII (3): 217–218. ISSN 0043-0374.
- Jentschura, Hansgeorg; Jung, Dieter & Mickel, Peter (1977). Warships of the Imperial Japanese Navy, 1869–1945. Annapolis, Maryland: United States Naval Institute. ISBN 978-0-87021-893-4.
- McLaughlin, Stephen (2003). Russian & Soviet Battleships. Annapolis, Maryland: Naval Institute Press. ISBN 1-55750-481-4.
- McTiernan, Mick, A Very Bad Place Indeed For a Soldier. The British involvement in the early stages of the European Intervention in Crete. 1897 – 1898, King's College, London, September 2014.
- Watts, Anthony John & Gordon, Brian G. (1971). The Imperial Japanese Navy. Garden City, New York: Doubleday. OCLC 241295.
