= ARA Patria =

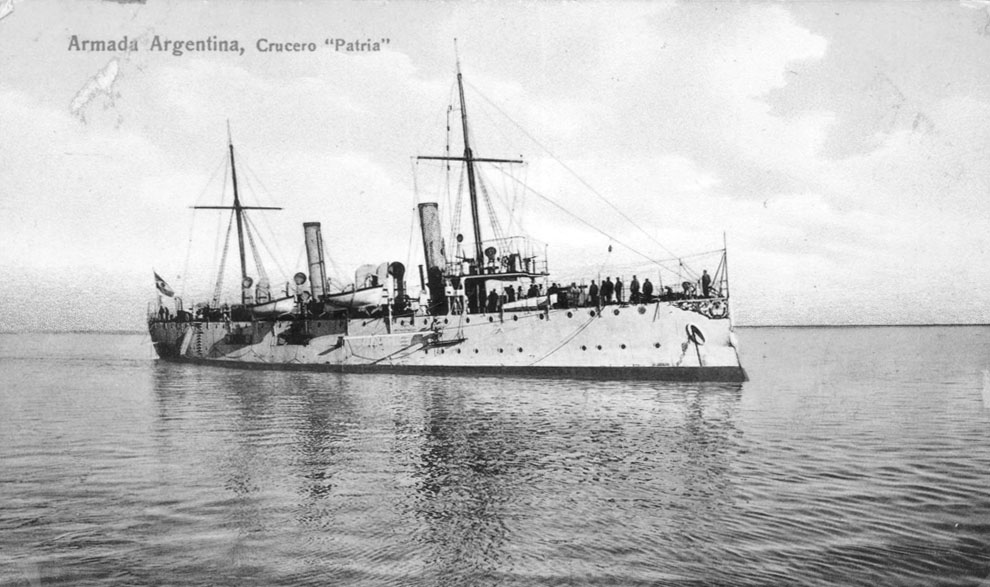
- ARA Patria underway

History

Argentina
- Name: Patria
- Builder: Samuda Brothers, Poplar (London), United Kingdom
- Launched: 28 December 1893
- Completed: 1894
- Decommissioned: 1927
- Fate: Scrapped

General characteristics
- Displacement: 1,070 tons
- Length: 262 ft 6 in (80.0 m)
- Beam: 30 ft 6 in (9.3 m)
- Draught: 13 ft (4.0 m)
- Installed power: 3,300 ihp (2,500 kW)
- Propulsion: 2 × 3-cylinder vertical triple-expansion steam engines; Locomotive boilers; Twin screws
- Speed: 20 kn (37 km/h)
- Complement: 159
- Armament: 2 × 120 mm (4.7 in) Armstrong guns; 4 × 65 mm (2.6 in) Armstrong guns; 2 × 47 mm (1.9 in) Nordenfelt guns; 2 × Nordenfelt machine guns; 5 × 18 in torpedo tubes

ARA Patria was a torpedo cruiser which served in the Argentine Navy between 1894 and 1927. It was a modified Dryad-class torpedo gunboat which were in service with the Royal Navy during the same period.

== History ==
The Patria was ordered from the British shipbuilder Laird Brothers and built at their Birkenhead shipyard, at a price of £87,000 to replace the torpedo boat ARA Rosales , which had sunk at Cabo Polonio in 1892. The funds were raised by public subscription, headed by the newspapers La Nación and La Prensa.

Patria was of similar design to the contemporary Dryad-class torpedo gunboats building for the British Royal Navy, but had a flush deck to improve seakeeping. The ship was launched in 1893 and completed in 1894. In November of that year the vessel departed from England, arriving in Argentina the following month. It participated in the naval exercises held in 1895.

In January and February 1902 it participated in the naval exercises as part of the 2nd Sea Division, led by Counter admiral Manuel José García-Mansilla.

Toward the end of its career it served as a survey vessel, finally being decommissioned in 1927 by General Order No. 207 of the Navy Ministry.

== See also ==
- List of cruisers
- List of ships of the Argentine Navy
