= Russian cruiser Admiral Nakhimov (1885) =

Russian armoured cruiser

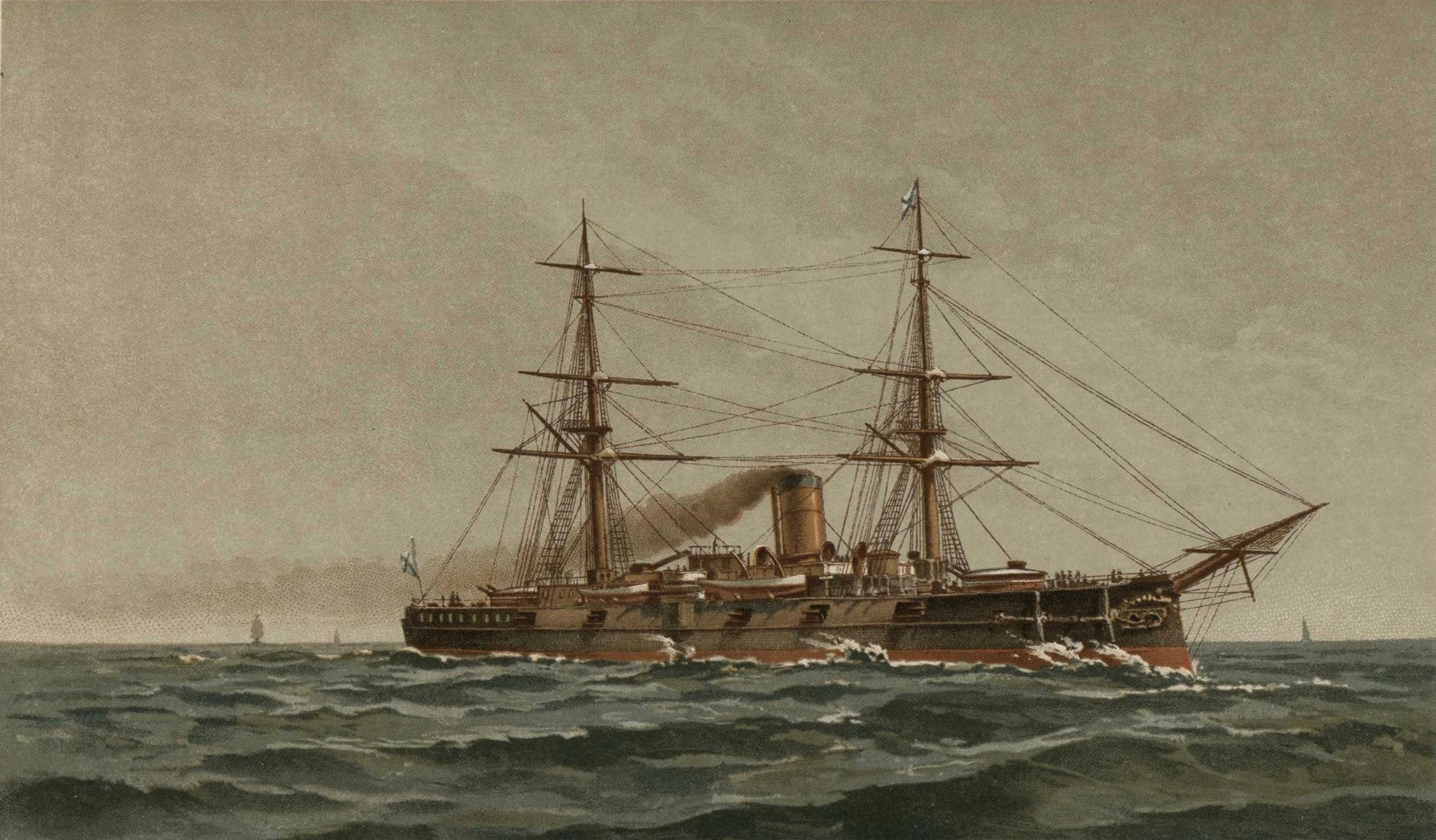

History

Russian Empire
- Name: Admiral Nakhimov
- Namesake: Pavel Nakhimov
- Builder: Baltic Works, Saint Petersburg, Russia
- Laid down: July 1884
- Launched: 21 October 1885
- Commissioned: 9 September 1888
- Fate: Sunk at the Battle of Tsushima, 28 May 1905

General characteristics
- Type: Armoured cruiser
- Displacement: 7,781 long tons (7,906 t) standard; 8,473 long tons (8,609 t) full load
- Length: 103.3 m (338 ft 11 in)
- Beam: 18.6 m (61 ft 0 in)
- Draught: 7.7 m (25 ft 3 in)
- Propulsion: 2 shaft reciprocating vertical triple expansion (VTE) engines; 12 cylindrical coal-fired boilers; 9,000 shp (6,700 kW)
- Speed: 17 knots (31 km/h; 20 mph)
- Range: 4,400 nmi (8,100 km)
- Boats & landing craft carried: 2 × torpedo boats; 2 × spar torpedo boats
- Complement: 572–650
- Armament: 8 × 203 mm (8 in) guns; 10 × 152 mm (6 in) guns; 4 × 110 mm (4.3 in) guns; 15 × 47 mm (1.9 in) 3-pounder guns; 3 × 381 mm (15 in) torpedo tubes; 40 × mines
- Armour: Compound armour; Belt: 254 mm (10 in); Deck: 51–76 mm (2–3 in); Barbettes: 203 mm (8 in); Turrets: 51–63 mm (2.0–2.5 in); Conning tower: 152 mm (6 in)

Admiral Nakhimov (Russian: Адмирал Нахимов), was an armoured cruiser in the Imperial Russian Navy during the Russo-Japanese War. She was named after Admiral Pavel Nakhimov.

== Construction ==
Admiral Nakhimov was ordered in 1881 as one of the first armoured cruisers. She was modeled after the British Royal Navy Imperieuse class cruisers, which were armed with four 234 mm guns in a rhomboid layout. Admiral Nakhimov was considered a more successful design. Her main armament consisted of 203 mm guns, which were lighter and their number could be doubled.

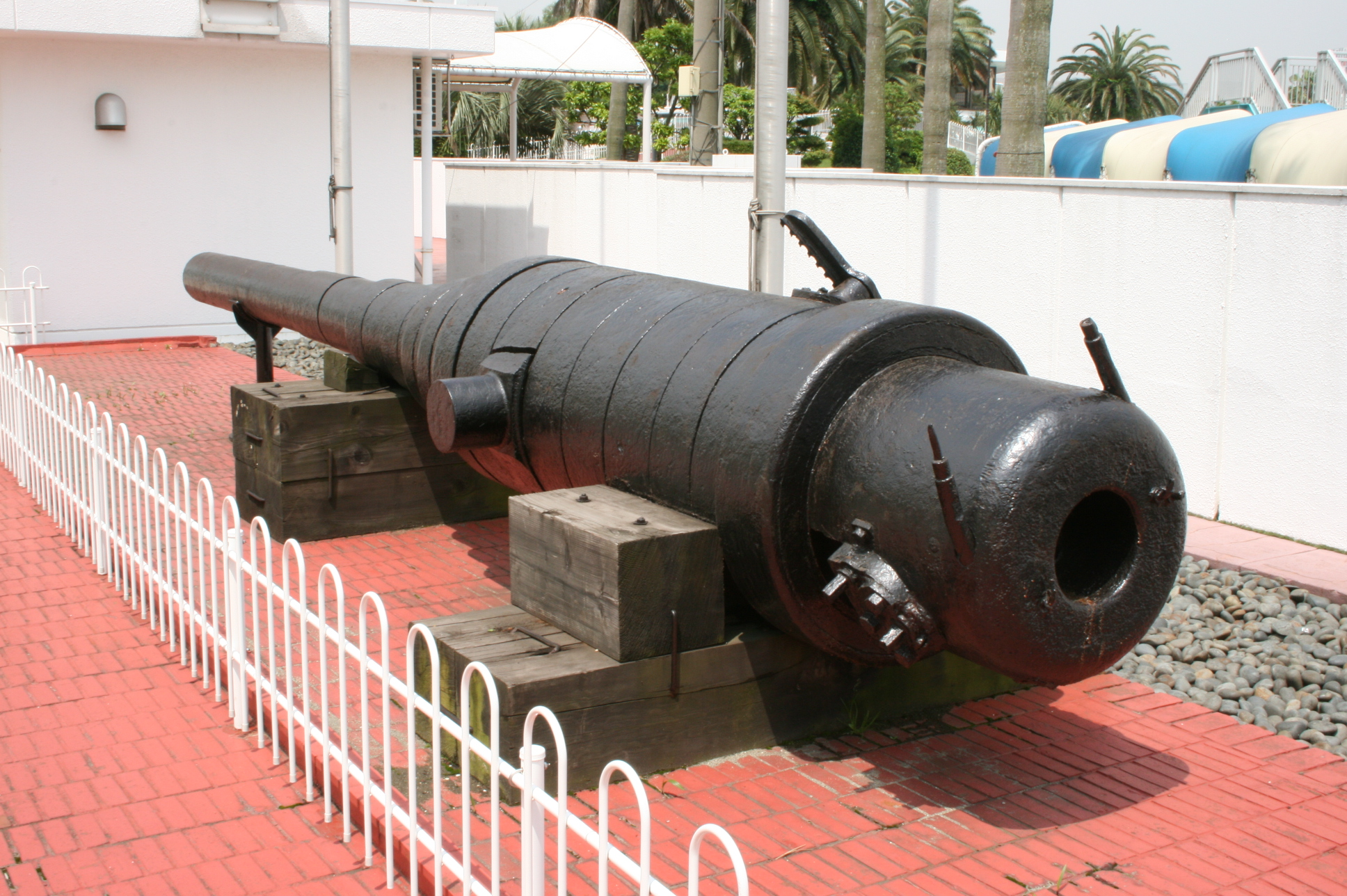
Gun of Admiral Nakhimov (20CMx35). Weight: 13.6 tons, length: 7 meters, shell: 87 kg, velocity: 587m/s. Museum of Maritime Science, Tokyo.

As a result, Admiral Nakhimov had probably the heaviest broadside (six 203 mm guns and five 152 mm guns) of all the armoured cruisers built in the 19th century. Unfortunately, her guns quickly became obsolete. Consideration was given to replacing them with quick-firing 152 mm guns (with eleven in a broadside), but it was not done due to the limited resources of Russian industry before the war with Japan. As well as steam engines, Nakhimov, like Imperieuse, was initially fitted with a full brig rigging, but this proved to lack utility and was eventually removed in 1898–1899.

The deficiencies of Nakhimov were connected with the time of her construction, and the rapid advance in naval technology during the period. As a result, she was already an obsolete vessel by 1905, inferior to newer cruisers. The main fault was weak protection against torpedoes, despite the fact she was the first Russian vessel to introduce anti-torpedo nets (which were useful only at slow speed). As quick-firing medium-caliber artillery became widely used her limited amount of side armour left most of the hull vulnerable. Her machinery also became obsolete and her speed was low.

She was laid down at the Baltic Shipyard in Saint Petersburg in the presence of Tsar Alexander III in July 1884, launched on 21 October 1885, and entered service on 9 September 1888.

== Operational record ==
=== Early service ===
Upon commissioning, Admiral Nakhimov was assigned to the Russian Pacific Fleet, departing Kronstadt on September 29, 1888 and arriving at Vladivostok in May 1889, where she was appointed flagship. In September 1891, she returned to the Baltic for repairs. In July 1893, she visited New York City, then Toulon as a part of the Russian Squadron, then she sailed to Vladivostok again, serving there for the next four years and taking part in seizure of Port Arthur following the Triple Intervention against Japan at the end of the First Sino-Japanese War. In 1898, she returned to the Baltic for repairs and modernization. In November 1899, she was moved to the Pacific Squadron in Port Arthur again. From 1900–1903, she was used for diplomatic missions between Port Arthur, Korea and Japan. During this time, her captain was Grand Duke Cyril Vladimirovich Romanov.

Admiral Nakhimov returned to Kronstadt again in 1903 for refit and modernization, as her weaponry was obsolete with a slow rate of fire and short range. However, due to the slow rate of work and economic issues, refit had not progressed very far before the start of the Russo-Japanese War in 1904.

=== Russo-Japanese War ===
During the Russo-Japanese war, Admiral Nakhimov was assigned to the Second Pacific Squadron, under the overall command of Admiral Zinovy Rozhestvensky, which was created from the Russian Baltic Fleet to relieve the Japanese blockade of Port Arthur. She departed the Baltic in October 1904, and as Admiral Nakhimov was more powerful than the other Russian cruisers, she was included into the 2nd Battleship Group of the Squadron, consisting of three obsolete battleships.

On 27 May 1905, the first day of the Battle of Tsushima, Admiral Nakhimov was the eighth and last ship in the main column. She was hit about 30 times, mainly by fire from Japanese armoured cruisers, and suffered 25 killed, and 51 injured, but retained her combat capabilities. Admiral Nakhimov slightly damaged the armoured cruiser Iwate with three 203 mm shells. At night, when the remaining Russian ships were attacked by torpedo boats and destroyers, Admiral Nakhimov was visible, turning on searchlights. Around 21.30 – 22.00 hours she was hit at the bow by a torpedo, fired by an unidentified ship. Despite the struggle of the crew, the ship was sinking and she was abandoned the next morning close to the island of Tsushima. The Japanese auxiliary cruiser Sado Maru rescued 523 of her crew, another 103 men escaped in boats and were captured later, and 18 men were lost. At about 10.00 on 28 May, Admiral Nakhimov sank at 34°34′N 129°32′E. Captain Rodionov later claimed that the ship had been sunk by a floating naval mine rather than a torpedo, and some crewmen testified that the captain had ordered the ship scuttled to avoid surrender, so accounts of her final moments vary.

== Legend of sunken treasure ==
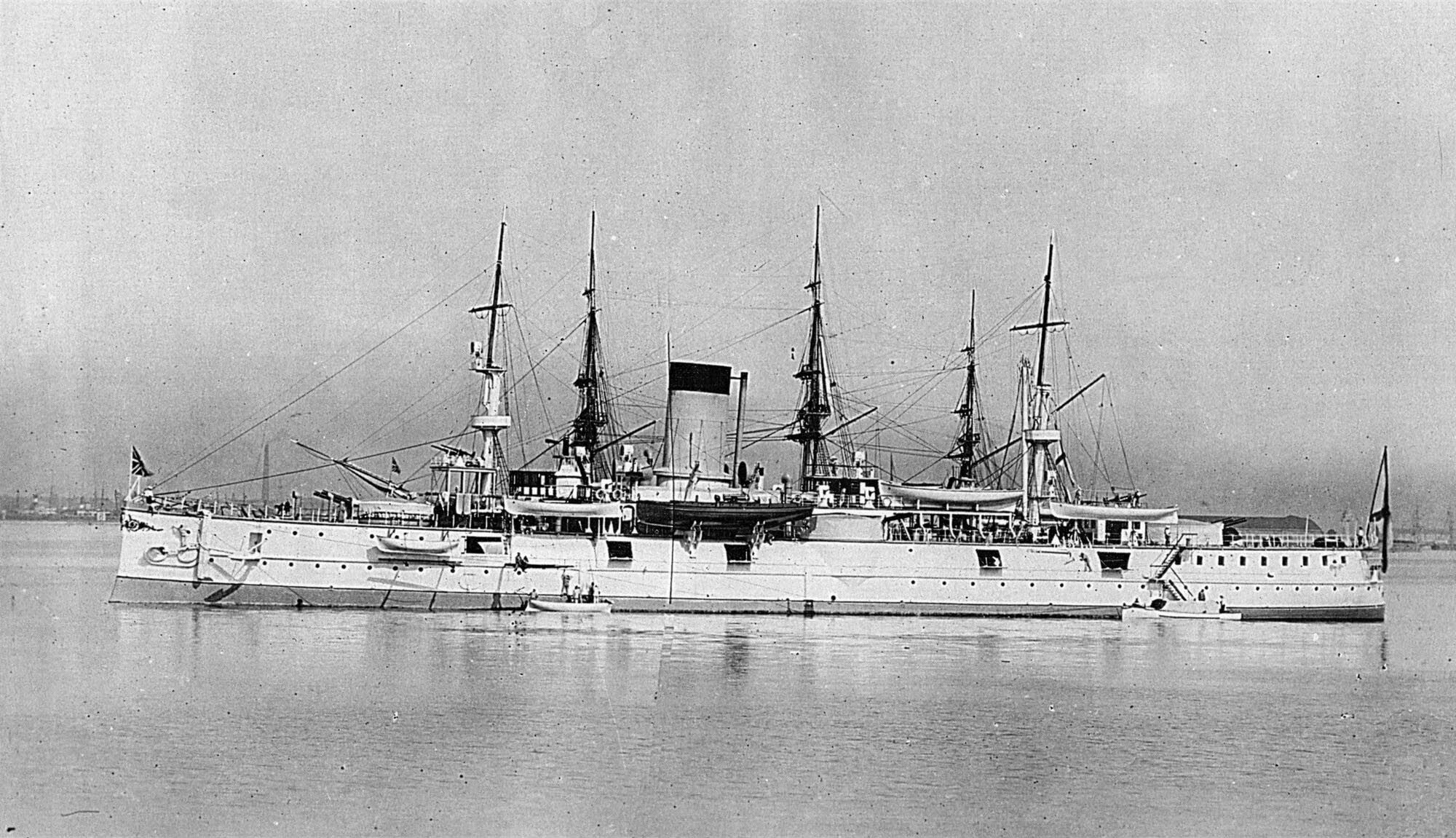
Admiral Nakhimov side view

In 1933, an American author named Garry Berg published a book 600 Billion in Water, making the unfounded allegation that the four ships of the Second Pacific Squadron which were sunk at the Battle of Tsushima had a horde of gold, worth US$5 million, of which $2 million was carried on Admiral Nakhimov.

In 1980, controversial Japanese businessman Ryōichi Sasakawa claimed to have salvaged the wreckage of Admiral Nakhimov over the strong protests of the Soviet Government. Sasakawa later publicized photos of what appeared to be a valuable cargo of gold bullion, platinum ingots, and British sovereigns, as well as crates of precious jewels. Sasakawa claimed that the treasure was worth over $36 billion in modern currency, but offered to turn it over to the Soviet Union, in return for the Kuril Islands to Japan. Sasakawa's credibility was completely ruined when it turned out that the metal shards he allegedly recovered from aboard the Admiral Nakhimov had the density of lead, but not platinum.
