= HMS Hazard (1894) =

Gunboat of the Royal Navy

Coordinates: 50°43′37″N 01°03′14″W

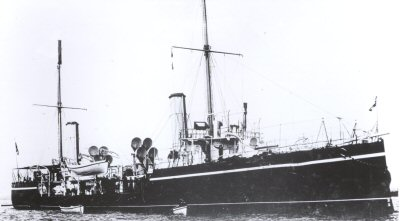
- Hazard

History

United Kingdom
- Name: Hazard
- Builder: Pembroke Dockyard
- Laid down: 1 December 1892
- Launched: 14 February 1894
- Commissioned: 24 July 1895
- Fate: Sunk in collision on 28 January 1918

General characteristics
- Class & type: Dryad-class torpedo gunboat
- Displacement: 1,070 tons
- Length: 262 ft 6 in (80.0 m)
- Beam: 30 ft 6 in (9.3 m)
- Draught: 13 ft (4.0 m)
- Installed power: 3,500 ihp (2,600 kW)
- Propulsion: 2 × 3-cylinder vertical triple-expansion steam engines; Locomotive boilers; Twin screws
- Speed: 18.2 knots (33.7 km/h; 20.9 mph)
- Complement: 120
- Armament: 2 × QF 4.7-inch (12 cm) guns; 4 × 6-pounder guns; 1 × Nordenfelt machine gun; 5 × 18-inch torpedo tubes; On conversion to a minesweeper in 1914 two torpedo tubes were removed

HMS Hazard was a Dryad-class torpedo gunboat of the Royal Navy. She was launched in 1894 and was converted into the world's first submarine depot ship in 1901. She collided with the submarine A3 on 2 February 1912, killing 14 men, and was herself sunk in collision with the Western Australia on 28 January 1918.

== Design ==
Ordered under the Naval Defence Act of 1889, which established the "Two-Power Standard", the class was contemporary with the first torpedo boat destroyers. With a length overall of 262 ft 6 in (80.01 m), a beam of 30 ft 6 in (9.30 m) and a displacement of 1,070 tons, these torpedo gunboats were not small ships by the standard of the time; they were larger than the majority of World War I destroyers. Hazard was engined by Fairfield with two sets of vertical triple-expansion steam engines, two locomotive-type boilers, and twin screws. This layout produced 3,500 indicated horsepower (2,600 kW), giving her a speed of 18.2 knots (33.7 km/h; 20.9 mph). She carried between 100 and 160 tons of coal and was manned by 120 sailors and officers.

== Armament ==
The armament when built comprised two QF 4.7-inch (12 cm) guns, four 6-pounder guns and a single 5-barrelled Nordenfelt machine gun. Her primary weapon was five 18-inch (450 mm) torpedo tubes, (Note: British "18 inch" torpedoes were 17.72 inches (45.0 cm) in diameter) with two reloads. On conversion to a minesweeper in 1914 two of the five torpedoes were removed.

== History ==
=== Naval review of 1897 ===
On 26 June 1897 Hazard was present at the Fleet Review at Spithead in celebration of Queen Victoria's Diamond Jubilee.

=== International Squadron ===
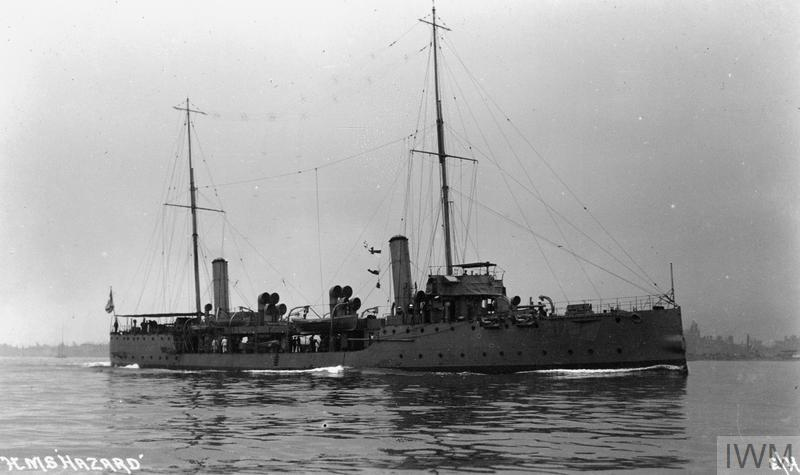
Hazard

Hazard deployed to Crete in 1897 and 1898 to operate as part of the International Squadron, a multinational force made up of ships of the Austro-Hungarian Navy, French Navy, Imperial German Navy, Italian Royal Navy (Regia Marina), Imperial Russian Navy, and Royal Navy that intervened in the February 1897-December 1898 Greek Christian uprising against the Ottoman Empire's rule on the island. The squadron′s senior admirals formed an international "Admirals Council" to govern Crete during the intervention, and in early September 1898 they ordered that the customs house at Candia (now Heraklion) be turned over to the British in order to initiate a system of export duties to fund administration of the island. On 6 September 1898, a well-armed Cretan Turkish mob attacked the small force of British soldiers and sailors at the customs house and at the British camp and hospital to the west at the other end of the town. The mob also massacred hundreds of Cretan Christian residents of the town. The only ship of the International Squadron on the scene, Hazard put reinforcements ashore and opened fire on the town with her 4.7-inch (119 mm) guns when Ottoman Army troops charged with keeping order did little to assist the British or Cretan Christian civilians or to restore order. Hazard lost four seamen killed and several wounded; Lieutenant Lewes, the commanding officer of Hazard, was promoted to commander as a result of the action, and Surgeon William Job Maillard was awarded the Victoria Cross. A monument to the seamen killed was erected in the Upper Barracca at Malta.

=== Submarine depot ship ===
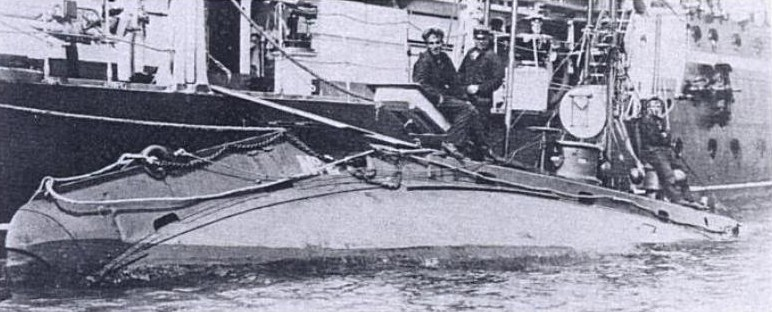
HM Submarine No.2 alongside Hazard

In 1901 Hazard was converted into the world's first submarine depot ship, the only ship of her class to be so converted. She was commissioned 20 August 1901 with a complement of 94 officers and men, her first captain in the new role was Captain Reginald Bacon, who held the post of "Inspecting Captain of submarine boats". She was despatched to Barrow-in-Furness to take up her new task. In the summer of 1902 Hazard led a group consisting of HM Submarines No.2 and No.3, and Torpedo Boat No.42 to Portsmouth, where, together with submarines No.1, No.4 and No.5, they formed the First Submarine Flotilla. She took part in the fleet review held at Spithead on 16 August 1902 for the coronation of King Edward VII. Commander Edgar Lees succeeded in command on 1 January 1903.

=== Collision with submarine A3 ===
On 2 February 1912 Hazard, under the command of Lieutenant Charles J C Little, collided with the submerged submarine A3. The submarine was in the process of surfacing during exercises when she was struck; the stricken submarine sank with the loss of all 14 personnel on board.

=== World War I ===
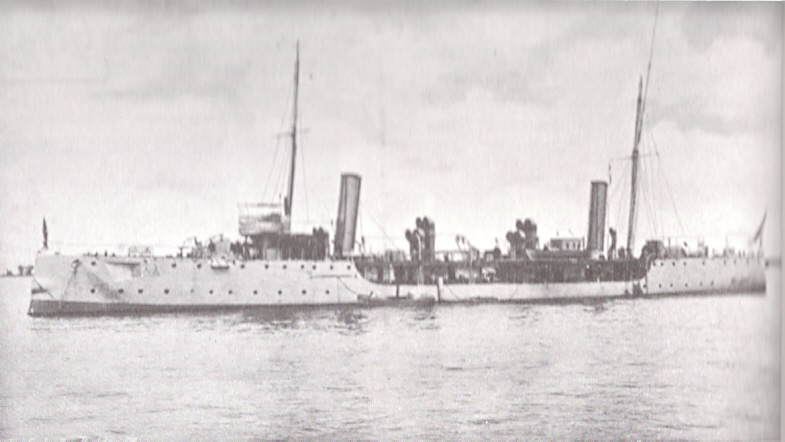
Hazard

In August 1914 Hazard was serving as the depot for the Fourth Submarine Flotilla.

== Loss ==
On 28 January 1918 Hazard was cut in two by the hospital ship Western Australia in thick fog in the eastern Solent about one-half mile (800 m) east of the Warner buoy, and sank with the loss of four crew. The wreck sits upside down in two parts in 30 m (98 ft) of water; various parts are missing having been salvaged. The wreck's location in a busy shipping channel, together with poor visibility, makes it an unpopular target for divers.

== Bibliography ==
- Brown, Les (2023). Royal Navy Torpedo Vessels. Barnsley, UK: Seaforth Publishing. ISBN 978-1-3990-2285-9.
- Clowes, Sir William Laird. The Royal Navy: A History From the Earliest Times to the Death of Queen Victoria, Volume Seven. London: Chatham Publishing, 1997. ISBN 1-86176-016-7.
- Colledge, J. J.; Warlow, Ben (2006) [1969]. Ships of the Royal Navy: The Complete Record of All Fighting Ships of the Royal Navy from the 15th Century to the Present (3rd Rev ed.). London: Chatham Publishing. ISBN 978-1-86176-281-8. OCLC 67375475.
- McTiernan, Mick, A Very Bad Place Indeed For a Soldier. The British involvement in the early stages of the European Intervention in Crete. 1897 - 1898, King's College, London, September 2014.
- Lyon, David & Winfield, Rif (2004). The Sail and Steam Navy List: All the Ships of the Royal Navy 1815–1889. Chatham Publishing. ISBN 978-1-86176-032-6. OCLC 52620555.
