= Imperator Aleksandr II-class battleship =

Russian class of battleships

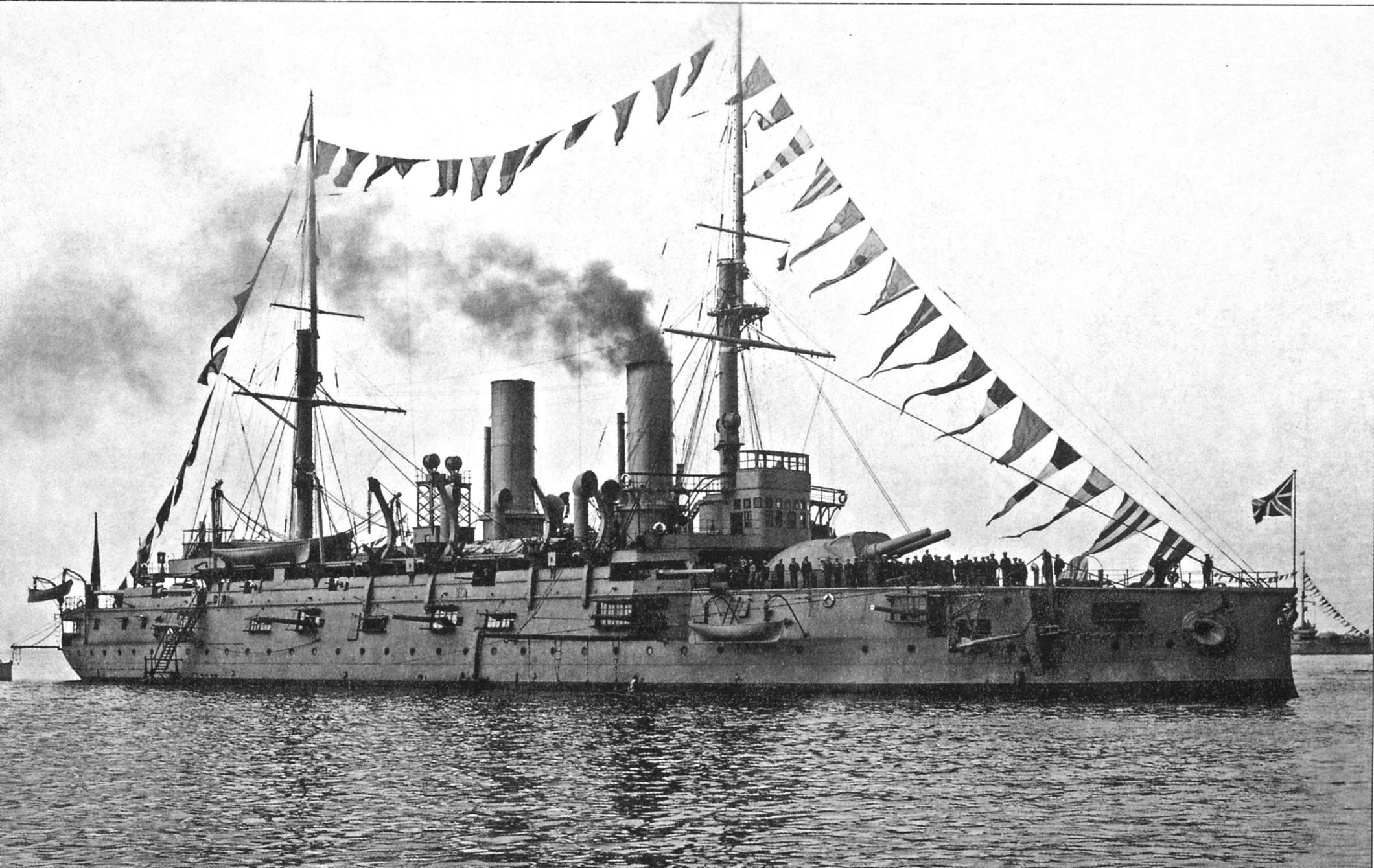
- Imperator Aleksandr II

Class overview
- Name: Imperator Aleksandr II-class battleship
- Builders: New Admiralty Yard
- Operators: Russian Navy; Imperial Japanese Navy
- Preceded by: Ekaterina II class
- Succeeded by: Dvenadsat Apostolov
- Subclasses: Imperator Nikolai I
- Built: 1885–1891
- In commission: 1891–1921
- Completed: 2
- Lost: 1
- Scrapped: 1

General characteristics Imperator Aleksandr II
- Type: Predreadnought battleship
- Displacement: 9,244 long tons (9,392 t)
- Length: 346 ft 6 in (105.61 m)
- Beam: 66 ft 11 in (20.40 m)
- Draft: 25 ft 9 in (7.85 m)
- Installed power: 12 cylindrical boilers; 8,289 ihp (6,181 kW)
- Propulsion: 2 shafts; 2 compound steam engines
- Speed: 15.27 knots (28.28 km/h; 17.57 mph)
- Range: 4,440 nmi (8,220 km; 5,110 mi) at 8 knots (15 km/h; 9.2 mph)
- Complement: 616
- Armament: 1 × twin 12 in (305 mm) guns; 4 × single 9 in (229 mm) guns; 8 × single 6 in (152 mm) guns; 10 × single 47 mm (1.9 in) Hotchkiss revolving cannon; 10 × single 37 mm (1.5 in) Hotchkiss revolving cannon; 5 × single 15 in (381 mm) torpedo tubes
- Armor: Compound armor; Belt: 4–14 in (102–356 mm); Deck: 2.5 in (64 mm); Barbette: 10 in (254 mm); Barbette hood: 3 in (76 mm)

The Imperator Aleksandr II-class battleships were a pair of predreadnought battleships built for the Imperial Russian Navy in the 1880s. They were intended to counter the small armored ships of the other Baltic powers. Construction was very prolonged and the ships were virtually obsolescent when completed. They were optimized for ramming.

Imperator Aleksandr II served in the Baltic and Mediterranean Seas before becoming a gunnery training ship in 1904, but she was inactive during World War I before joining the Bolsheviks in 1917. She was sold for scrap in 1922. Imperator Nikolai I served in the Baltic and Mediterranean Seas as well as the Pacific Ocean during the First Sino-Japanese War and the Russo-Japanese War. She surrendered after the Battle of Tsushima in 1905 and was commissioned in the Imperial Japanese Navy before she was sunk as a target in 1915.

== Design ==
The Imperator Aleksandr II-class battleships were the first all-steel battleships to be built for the Baltic Fleet and were designed to allow Russia to dominate the Baltic Sea by defeating rival ships like the Helgoland and the German Sachsen-class ironclads, both of which were built of wrought iron. They were designed according to the tactical theories of the day which emphasized ramming and incorporated a ram bow. In addition their forecastle deck sloped slightly downwards to allow the main guns to fire at the waterline of the enemy at short range as the ship closed to ram. A full transverse armored bulkhead protected the forward 9 in (229 mm) guns from raking fire and no armor was originally provided to protect them from the side. They were given a full sailing rig to allow for deployments to the Mediterranean and other distant locations although it was never actually used. Imperator Nikolai I was originally going to be built to a completely different design, but this was changed at the last minute to a modified version of the Imperator Aleksandr II design, so there were significant differences between the two ships.

=== General characteristics ===
Imperator Aleksandr II was 334 feet (102 m) long at the waterline and 346 feet 6 inches (105.61 m) long overall. She had a beam of 66 ft 11 in (20.40 m) and a draft of 25 feet 9 inches (7.85 m). She displaced 9,244 long tons (9,392 t) at load, over 800 long tons (813 t) more than her designed displacement of 8,440 long tons (8,575 t). Imperator Nikolai I was dimensionally similar to her sister except that her draft was only 24 feet 3 inches (7.39 m). She was also 250 long tons (254 t) heavier than her sister.

The hull was subdivided by one centerline longitudinal and ten transverse watertight bulkheads and it had a double bottom extending from frame 12 to frame 74. It had a metacentric height of 3 feet 9 inches (1.14 m). They were considered to have good seagoing qualities, with a tactical diameter of 570 yards (520 m) and they could complete a full 360° circle in seven minutes and 32 seconds.

=== Propulsion ===
The Imperator Aleksandr II-class ships had two 3-cylinder vertical compound steam engines driving 17-foot (5.2 m) screw propellers. Twelve cylindrical boilers provided steam to the engines. The engines of the Imperator Aleksandr II were built by Baltic Works and had a total designed output of 8,500 ihp (6,338 kW). On trials, the powerplant produced 8,289 ihp (6,181 kW), and a top speed of 15.27 knots (28.28 km/h; 17.57 mph). She carried 967 long tons (983 t) of coal that provided a range of 4,400 nautical miles (8,100 km) at a speed of 8 knots (15 km/h; 9.2 mph) and 1,770 nautical miles (3,280 km) at a speed of 15 knots (28 km/h; 17 mph).

Imperator Nikolai I's engines were built by the Franco-Russian Works, but only had a designed output of 8,000 ihp (5,966 kW). They were a disappointment on trials, only producing 7,842 ihp (5,848 kW), and a top speed of 14.5 knots (26.9 km/h; 16.7 mph). She carried 967 long tons (983 t) of coal that gave her a range of 2,630 nautical miles (4,870 km) at a speed of 10 knots (19 km/h; 12 mph).

=== Armament ===
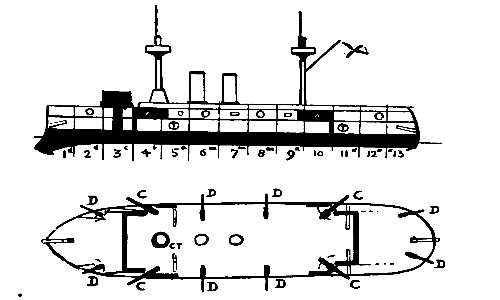
Plan and side view diagram of the Imperator Aleksandr II class. The guns labeled 'C' are 9-inch and 'D' are 6-inch. This shows Imperator Nikolai's torpedo layout

The main armament of the Imperator Aleksandr II-class ships was a pair of 12-inch (305 mm) Obukhov Model 1877 30-caliber guns. Those in Imperator Aleksandr II were fitted in a twin barbette mount forward, but Imperator Nikolai I's guns were fitted in a turret. These guns had a maximum elevation of 15° and could depress 2° and could traverse 220°. 60 rounds per gun were carried. They fired a 731.3-pound (331.7 kg) shell at a muzzle velocity of 1,870 ft/s (570 m/s) to a range of 5,570 yards (5,090 m) at an elevation of 6°. The rate of fire was one round every four to five minutes.

The four 9-inch (229 mm) Obukhov Model 1877 35-caliber guns were on center-pivot mounts in casemates at the corners of the citadel, the hull being recessed to increase their arcs of fire ahead or behind. The forward guns could traverse a total of 125°, including targets within about 4° of the centerline. The rear guns had an arc of fire of 105° and could fire on targets within about 10° of the centerline. These guns had a maximum elevation of 15° and could depress 5°. They were provided with 125 rounds per gun. They fired a 'light' shell that weighed 277–280 lb (126–127 kg) or a 'heavy' shell that weighed 415 lb (188 kg). The muzzle velocity achieved depended on the shell weight and the type of propellant. A 'light' shell with brown powder reached 2,142 ft/s (653 m/s) while that same shell with smokeless powder achieved 2,326 ft/s (709 m/s). In contrast a 'heavy' shell with brown powder could only be propelled at a velocity of 1,867 ft/s (569 m/s). A 277-lb 'light' shell had a maximum range of 10,330 yards (9,450 m) when fired at an elevation of 15° with smokeless powder. The rate of fire was one round every minute or two.

The eight 6-inch (152 mm) Model 1877 35-caliber guns were mounted on broadside pivot mounts. Four were fitted between the 9-inch guns and could traverse a total of 100°. The others were mounted at each end of the ship where they could fire directly ahead or astern. Each gun had an arc of fire of 130°. The guns could elevate to a maximum of 12° and depress 8°. They fired a 'heavy' shell that weighed 119–123.5 lb (54.0–56.0 kg) at a velocity of 1,896 ft/s (578 m/s) or a 'light' shell that weighed 91.5 lb (41.5 kg) with a muzzle velocity of 2,329 ft/s (710 m/s). A 'light' shell had a maximum range of 8,170 yards (7,470 m) when fired at an elevation of 12°. They could fire one round per minute.

The ten 47-millimeter (1.9 in) Hotchkiss revolving cannon were mounted in hull embrasures of the ship, between the nine and six-inch guns to defend against torpedo boats. They fired a 3.3-pound (1.5 kg) shell at a muzzle velocity of 1,476 ft/s (450 m/s) at a rate of 30 rounds per minute to a range of 2,020 yards (1,850 m). Four 37-millimeter (1.5 in) Hotchkiss revolving cannon were mounted in each fighting top. They fired a 1.1-pound (0.50 kg) shell at a muzzle velocity of 1,450 ft/s (440 m/s) at a rate of 32 rounds per minute to a range of 3,038 yards (2,778 m).

Imperator Aleksandr II carried five above-water 15-inch (381 mm) torpedo tubes, two in the bow, two broadside tubes that could traverse 70° and a tube in the stern. Smaller 14-inch (356 mm) torpedo tubes could be mounted in four of the ship's cutters. 36 mines could be carried. Imperator Nikolai I had six torpedo tubes that were arranged differently. Only one was in the bow, four were on the broadside, two forward and aft, and the usual stern tube.

=== Protection ===
Compound armor was used throughout the Imperator Aleksandr II-class ships. The main waterline belt had a maximum thickness of 14 inches (356 mm) abreast the machinery spaces and was 8 ft 6 in (2.59 m) high on Imperator Aleksandr II. 3 ft 6 in (1.07 m) of this was supposed to extend above the waterline at design displacement, but only 2 feet (0.6 m) was actually above the waterline as actually completed. The belt tapered to 8 inches (203 mm) at the lower edge and thinned in stages. It was 12 inches thick abreast the magazines and thinned down to 3.9 inches (99 mm) at the bow and 4.9 inches (124 mm) at the stern. It was backed by 10 inches (254 mm) of wood. The configuration of the waterline belt in Imperator Nikolai I differed somewhat from her sister. The belt was only 8 feet (2 m) high with 3 ft (0.91 m) above the designed waterline and 5 feet (1.5 m) below. At bow and stern it was six inches thick. The flat protective deck was positioned at the upper edge of the belt on both ships and was 2.5 inches (64 mm) thick and consisted of two layers of mild steel.

The barbette and turret sides had a thickness of 10 inches while the turret roof was 2½ inches thick. Initially the barbette was open-topped, but a 3-inch (76 mm) thick protective hood was added in late 1893. The transverse bulkheads were six inches thick, but the nine-inch guns were protected by a patch of side armor only three inches thick and the six-inch guns by a patch only 2 inches (51 mm) thick. Originally there was no side armor above the main belt, but that was added when the original disappearing main guns mounts and their pear-shaped barbette were deleted and made some weight available. No partitions separated the casemated guns, nor was there any armor between the guns. The conning tower had 8-inch (203 mm) sides on the Imperator Aleksandr II, but they were only six inches thick on Imperator Nikolai I, but it had a 2½-inch thick roof on both ships.

== Construction ==
Imperator Aleksandr II (Russian: Император Александр II) was named after the Emperor Alexander II of Russia. She was built by the New Admiralty Yard at Saint Petersburg. Laid down on 12 July 1885, (Note: All dates used in this article are New Style) she was launched on 13 July 1887, and completed in June 1891, although her trials lasted until the spring of 1892. Imperator Nikolai I (Russian: Император Николай I) was named after the Emperor Nicholas I of Russia. She was built by the Franco-Russian Works at Saint Petersburg. Construction began on 20 March 1886; she was launched on 1 June 1889, and completed in July 1891 although her trials lasted almost a year afterwards.

== History ==
Name	Built by	Laid down	Launched	Completed	Fate
Imperator Aleksandr II	Admiralty Shipyards	June 1885	July 1887	June 1891	Broken up 1922
Imperator Nikolai I (1889)	Admiralty Shipyards	4 August 1886	1 June 1889	July 1891	Captured by Japan 1905

Imperator Aleksandr II served in the Baltic Fleet and represented Russia, along with the cruiser Rurik, at the opening of the Kiel Canal in June 1895. She ran aground in Vyborg Bay later that year, but suffered little damage. Joining the Mediterranean Squadron in August 1896, she supported Russian interests during the Cretan Revolt of 1897. Imperator Aleksandr II returned to Kronstadt in September 1901. She was reboilered in December 1903 and modified 1904–05 to serve as an artillery school ship with her secondary armament replaced by more modern guns. Her crew refused to suppress the mutinous garrison of Fort Konstantin defending Kronstadt in August 1906. She was assigned to the Artillery Training Detachment in 1907. During World War I, she was mainly based in Kronstadt where her crew was active in the revolutionary movement. She was renamed Zarya Svobody (Russian: Заря Свободы: Dawn of Freedom) in May 1917. Turned over to the Kronstadt port authority on 21 April 1921, Imperator Aleksandr II was sold for scrap on 22 August 1922. She was towed to Germany during the autumn of 1922, but was not stricken from the Navy List until 21 November 1925.

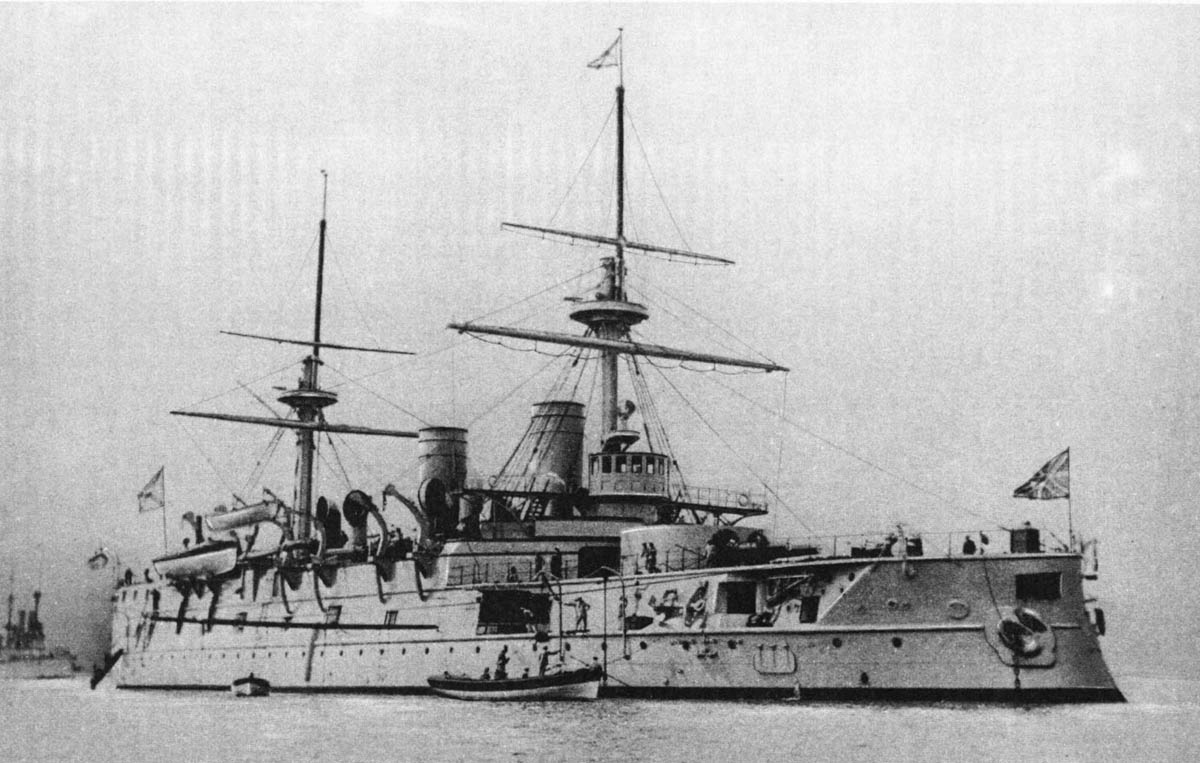
Imperator Nikolai I

According to N. J. M. Campbell in Conway's All the World's Fighting Ships 1860–1905, Imperator Aleksandr II was reconstructed in France between 1902 and 1904, with her torpedo tubes removed and her six and nine-inch guns exchanged for five 8-inch (200 mm) 45-caliber guns and eight six-inch 45-caliber guns. Her revolver cannon were also exchanged for ten three-pounder guns. V.V. Arbazov in Bronenoset︠s︡ Imperator Aleksandr II confirms that the torpedo tubes were removed and claims that she had her nine-inch guns replaced by five 8-inch, the fifth being placed at the stern, her old six-inch guns were exchanged for newer, more powerful models, and four 47 mm and four 120 mm guns were added on the upper deck, presumably replacing the old revolver cannon. However, this happened in Russia, not France.

Imperator Nikolai I sailed in June 1892 for New York City to participate in the celebration honoring the 400th anniversary of the discovery of America. She was assigned to the Mediterranean Squadron upon her return and visited Toulon in October 1893. Sailing for the Pacific Ocean during the First Sino-Japanese War and arrived at Nagasaki, Japan on 28 April 1895, she remained in the Pacific until late 1896, when she returned to the Mediterranean Squadron and supported Russian interests during the Cretan Revolt. After returning to the Baltic in April 1898, Imperator Nikolai I was extensively refitted in 1899–1901 and received new engines and boilers. She returned to the Mediterranean in September 1901 and remained there for the next three years. Refitted in late 1904 during the Russo-Japanese War, she served as the flagship of the Third Pacific Squadron under Rear Admiral Nikolai Nebogatov and departed Liepāja on 15 January 1905 for the Pacific. She was slightly damaged during the Battle of Tsushima, receiving one hit from a 12-inch gun, two from eight-inch guns and two from six-inch guns, and suffered only 5 killed and 35 men wounded. She was surrendered, along with most of the Third Pacific Squadron, by Admiral Nebogatov the following day and was taken into the Imperial Japanese Navy as the 'Iki. After serving as a gunnery training ship until 1910, Imperator Nikolai I became a first-class coast defense ship and a training vessel. She was stricken on 1 May 1915 and sunk as a target by the battlecruisers Kongō and Hiei, although Watts and Gordon in The Imperial Japanese Navy claim that she was scrapped in 1922.

== See also ==
- List of ironclads of Russia

== Bibliography ==
- Arbuzov, V. V. (1997). Bronenoset︠s︡ Imperator Aleksandr II. Bronenost︠s︡y russkogo flota (in Russian). Vol. 4. Saint Petersburg: Izd. alʹmanakha "Korabli i srazhenii︠a︡.
- Campbell, N. J. M. (1979). "Russia". In Chesneau, Roger & Kolesnik, Eugene M. (eds.). Conway's All the World's Fighting Ships 1860–1905. New York: Mayflower Books. pp. 170–215. ISBN 0-8317-0302-4.
- Jane, F.T., ed. (1904). Jane's Fighting Ships. Sampson, Low, Marston, London.
- McLaughlin, Stephen (2003). Russian & Soviet Battleships. Annapolis, Maryland: Naval Institute Press. ISBN 1-55750-481-4.
