= William Job Maillard =

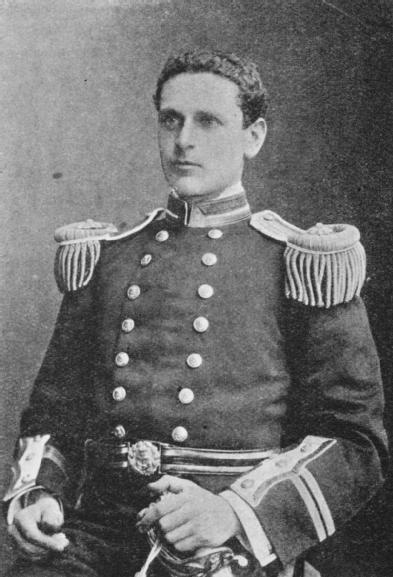
- Born: 10 March 1863; Banwell, Somerset, England
- Died: 10 September 1903 (aged 40); Bournemouth, Dorset, England
- Burial place: Wimborne Road Cemetery, Bournemouth, Dorset, England
- Military career
- Allegiance: United Kingdom
- Branch: Royal Navy
- Service years: 1889–1902
- Rank: Staff Surgeon
- Units: HMS Blake; HMS Hazard
- Conflicts: 1898 Occupation of Crete
- Awards: Victoria Cross

William Job Maillard, VC (10 March 1863 – 10 September 1903) was a British surgeon, officer in the Royal Navy, and a recipient of the Victoria Cross (VC), the highest award for gallantry in the face of the enemy that can be awarded to British and Commonwealth forces. In addition, he was "the first and only naval medical officer to win the VC".

== Early life and career ==
Born in the village of Banwell, Somerset, Maillard was educated at Kingswood School in Bath, Dunheved College in Launceston and Guy's Hospital, London, from 1882 to 1889, when he won the gold medal. He joined the Royal Navy in 1889, first serving in HMS Blake. Maillard was 35 years old, and a surgeon in the Royal Navy during the 1898 Occupation of Crete when the following deed took place for which he was awarded the Victoria Cross (VC).

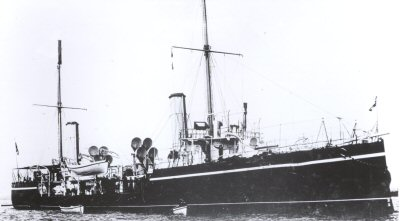
HMS Hazard

On 6 September 1898 at Candia, Crete, Greece, two parties of men from HMS Hazard went to the assistance of the Customs House Garrison, which was being besieged. Later, when medical help was called for, Surgeon Maillard, who had disembarked and reached a place of safety, went back through a deluge of bullets in an attempt to rescue one of the seamen who was wounded and had fallen back into the boat. He was, however, almost dead and it was impossible for the surgeon to lift him, as the boat was drifting. He returned to his post unhurt, but his clothes were riddled with bullets.

Maillard was the first and only naval medical officer to win the VC. He later achieved the rank of staff surgeon, and retired from the navy on 7 April 1902. He died in Bournemouth on 10 September 1903.

Maillard's medal is displayed in the Lord Ashcroft Gallery in the Imperial War Museum, London.

== Bibliography ==
- Ashcroft, Michael (2007) [2006]. Victoria Cross Heroes. London: Headline Review. ISBN 978-0-7553-1633-5.
- Buzzell, Nora, ed. (1997). The Register of the Victoria Cross. Cheltenham, Gloucestershire: This England Alma House. ISBN 0-906324-27-0.
