= Kronstadt–Toulon naval visits =

1891 and 1893 Franco-Russian diplomatic visits

The French fleet at Kronstadt

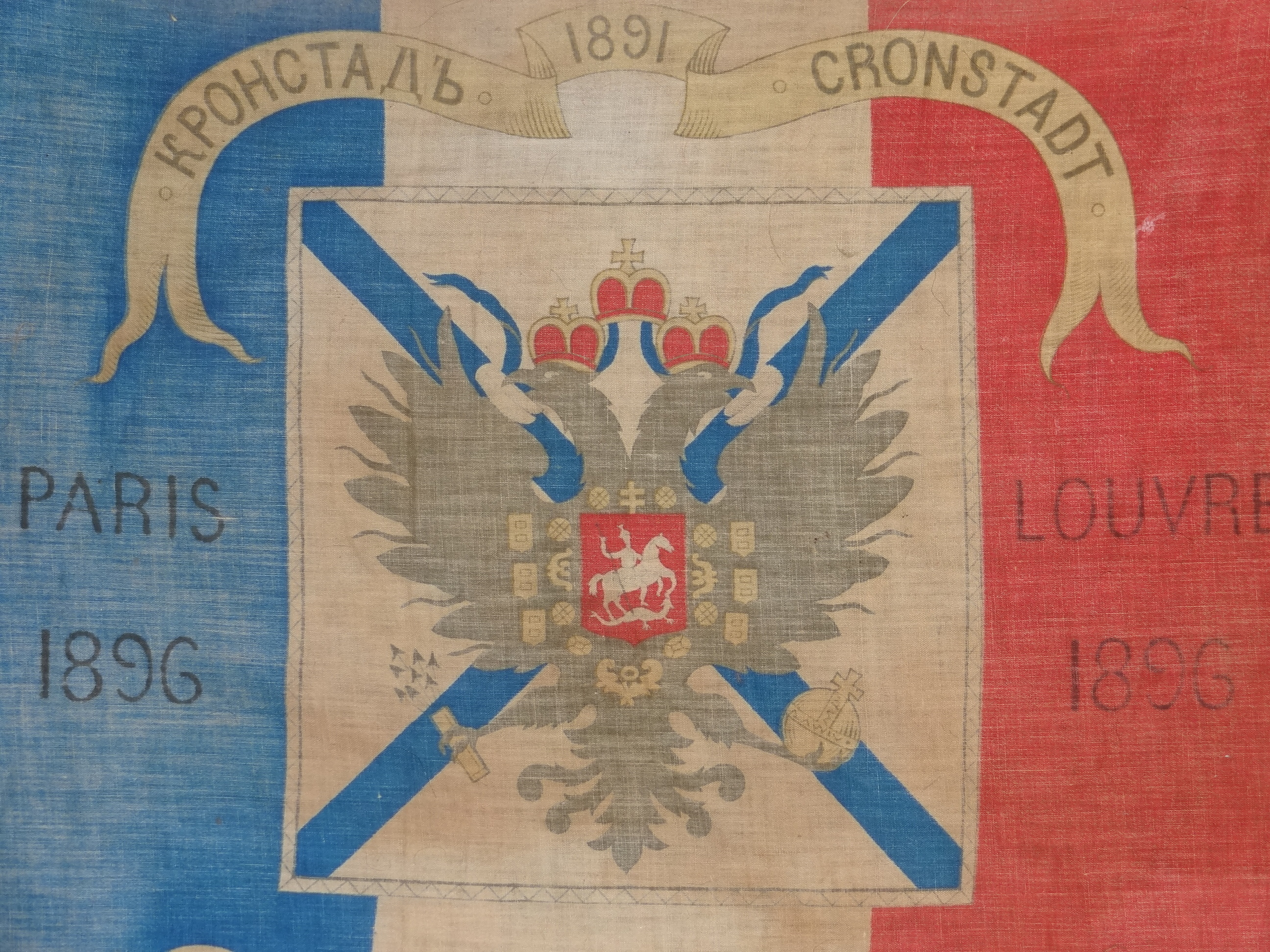
An 1896 banner commemorating the 1891 Kronstadt visit

The Kronstadt–Toulon naval visits were reciprocal diplomatic visits carried out by the French and Russian navies in the lead up to the Franco-Russian Alliance (1894–1917). The visits served as cover to exchange letters between the countries' foreign offices making key defensive agreements. The French Navy visited Kronstadt on the Gulf of Finland on 23 July 1891 and the Russian Navy visited Toulon on 13 October 1893. Both visits were received by crowds of people, speeches from dignitaries and the singing of anthems. During the Toulon visit the Russians attempted to secure naval bases on the French Mediterranean coast but were unsuccessful. The Franco-Russian Alliance later, with the addition of Britain, developed into the Triple Entente that opposed Austria and Germany during the First World War.

== Background ==
Germany entered into the Triple Alliance with Austria and Italy in 1882, forming a powerful bloc of Central European military power. In 1890 Germany allowed the Reinsurance Treaty with Russia to lapse. This treaty guaranteed the neutrality of either power in certain instances of war in Europe. The loss of the treaty left Russia concerned about an invasion from Austria at a time when France, diplomatically isolated in Europe since the loss of the 1870–71 Franco-Prussian War, was worried about another war with Germany.

The Germans had presumed that Tsarist Russia was too ideologically different from Republican France for any formal alliance to be agreed. However the two countries' shared concerns over the Triple Alliance led to increasingly friendly relations. Russia at this time was reliant on French investment since Bismarck had banned German nationals from lending to Russia in 1887. Russia was less in favour of a formal defence agreement than the French were but wanted to guarantee a few years of peace to allow it to prepare for war; both parties therefore planned to enter into a series of secret agreements. Writing in 1893 Russian foreign minister Nikolay Girs said that the actions of "Bismarck drove us into the arms of France".

== Kronstadt ==
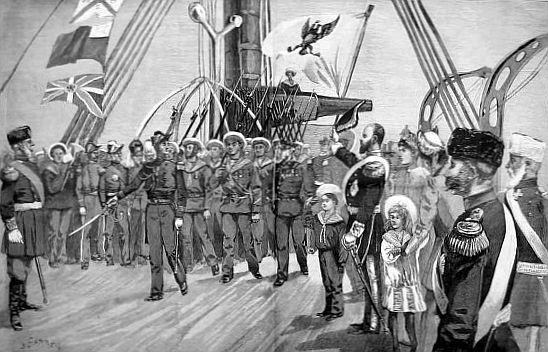
Emperor Alexander III raises his hat during the singing of the Marseillaise

A French Navy squadron visited the Russian port of Kronstadt on the Gulf of Finland on 23 July 1891. The squadron remained in the port for ten days during which it was granted an enthusiastic reception by the Russian populace. The French national anthem, La Marseillaise - previously banned in Russia as an anthem of republicanism, was sung by the Dmitri Slaviansky D'Agreneff choir. The Russian Emperor Alexander III, although known to be unenthusiastic about closer relationships with France, agreed to stand to attention during the singing of the anthem. Many notable people travelled to visit the port from the national capital, Saint Petersburg, just 31 kilometres (19 mi) away and crowds on the quayside cheered "Vive la France". On 2 August the French officers were hosted at a meal in the capital. Some 600 guests attended and entertainment included the singing of both countries' national anthems and the performance of the second act of the French-language opera La fille du régiment.

During the visit an agreement was reached, via an exchange of letters from the countries' foreign ministers, that if war was threatened in Europe then the two nations would agree on a joint response. There was also an agreement that if any of the Triple Alliance powers mobilised then France and Russia would both respond in kind. The agreement was kept secret but the naval visit served as a public indication of closer ties between the two nations and was viewed as an indication that a formal alliance was all but guaranteed to follow.

The 1891 agreement was followed by more detailed arrangements including an 1892 mutual defence pact that the countries would come to one another's defence if either was attacked by Germany. In the wake of the agreement France made large loans to Russia and increased investment in its industrial development campaign. The British prime minister, Lord Salisbury, responded to the Kronstadt visit by inviting the French squadron to call at Portsmouth on its return journey to demonstrate that "England has no antipathy to France".

== Toulon ==
Russian Admiral Theodor Avellan aboard the battleship Imperator Nikolai I as depicted in Le Petit Journal, 7 October 1893

On 13 October 1893 the Russian Navy repaid the Kronstadt visit with a visit by a squadron under Rear Admiral Theodor Avellan to the French naval base at Toulon. The Russian battleship Imperator Nikolai I from the Baltic was joined by the cruiser Pamiat Azova from Cádiz and the cruisers Admiral Nakhimov and Rynda travelling from the United States. The gunboat Terets later joined the squadron in port, from the Mediterranean. The strength of the squadron sent was an indication of the political importance of the visit, which served to seal the mutual defence pact signed by the countries. In France the visit was viewed as more serious than that at Kronstadt and was perceived to formally end the period of French diplomatic isolation.

The response of the French public was enthusiastic. By some estimates 300,000 people travelled to the town to welcome the squadron with some 165,000 railway tickets sold. This overwhelmed the town, which had only 70,000 residents, and led to food and water shortages. Many thousands were forced to sleep in the open, on boats or in carriages. Also, the town's sewerage provision was inadequate and a writer in the British medical journal The Lancet raised concerns about a possible epidemic.

The huge crowds lined the harbour, part of which was renamed "Kronstadt Quay", and sang the Russian national anthem. Numerous speeches were given by admirals, ministers and diplomats, commemorative plates were produced, celebratory songs performed and poems read by schoolchildren. Avellan was presented with jewellery including 2,300 bracelets embossed with "Cronstadt et Toulon" and the dates of the two visits, as presents for officers' wives and daughters. Avellan's officers afterwards toured France and visited Paris.

Russia was keen to increase its influence in the Mediterranean and during the visit entered discussions with the French government over the leasing of naval bases on the Mediterranean coast. Despite some enthusiasm (and even a suggestion that the countries could maintain a joint Mediterranean Fleet), no agreement was reached. After the Toulon visit Avellan took his squadron to the Eastern Mediterranean in an attempt to pressure Greece and Turkey into granting Russia a naval base on their territory. Avellan's ships lay off Piraeus for three months, keen to secure a coaling station on the isles of Poros where the Russian government owned land. British diplomatic pressure prevented this from happening and afterwards the Russian Navy, distracted by the 1894 outbreak of the First Sino-Japanese War, shifted its focus to the Pacific and Arctic. Britain responded to the Toulon visit by dispatching a squadron to visit the Italian naval base at La Spezia, keen to maintain Italian friendship against a possible Franco-Russian threat in the Mediterranean.

Leo Tolstoy was critical of the naval visits in his 1894 essay Christianity and Patriotism. He considered the demonstrations of patriotism and friendship as contrived and regarded the sentiments shown during speeches as absurd.

== Impact ==
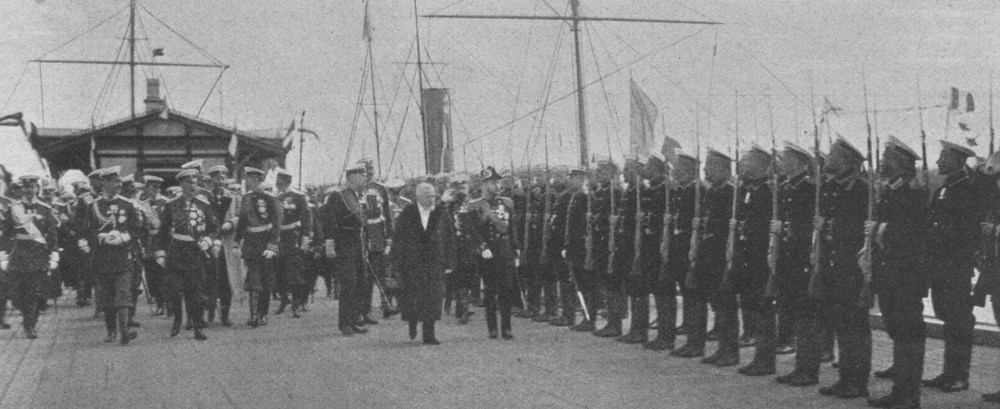
French President Émile Loubet and Russian Emperor Nicholas II review sailors at Kronstadt in 1902

In the year following the Toulon visit France and Russia negotiated the terms of the Franco-Russian Alliance. The alliance marked a significant shift in the balance of power in Europe with the Franco-Russian bloc standing as a counter to the dominance of the Triple Alliance. The French, keen to keep the alliance secret, chose not to discuss the matter in parliament and it was instead concluded by an exchange of letters in 1894. The Italians learned of the alliance and it caused them to reconsider their obligations to the Triple Alliance. This worried Austria who feared fighting on two fronts: against Russia and Italy. These fears were not unfounded, as after the 1915 Treaty of London the Italians declared war on Austria in the hope of gaining territory in the Alps and on the Adriatic Coast.

The Franco-Russian alliance was renewed and strengthened in 1899 and 1912. The alliance was supplemented by the Anglo-French Entente Cordiale of 1904 and the Anglo-Russian Convention of 1907 and developed into the Triple Entente which opposed Germany and Austria during the First World War.
