= HMS Harrier (1894) =

Gunboat of the Royal Navy

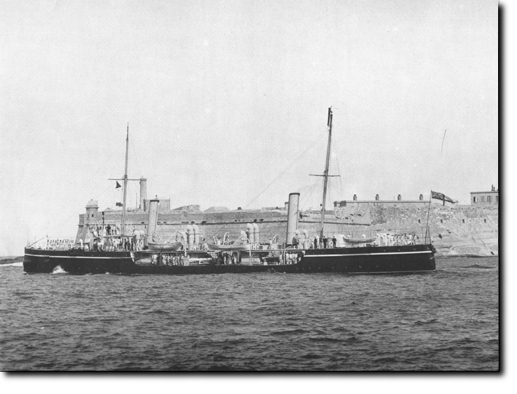
- Harrier sailing from Malta c.1900

History

United Kingdom
- Name: HMS Harrier
- Builder: Devonport Dockyard
- Laid down: 21 January 1893
- Launched: 20 February 1894
- Commissioned: 8 July 1896
- Fate: Sold for commercial use in 1920

General characteristics
- Class & type: Dryad-class torpedo gunboat
- Displacement: 1,070 tons
- Length: 262 ft 6 in (80.0 m)
- Beam: 30 ft 6 in (9.3 m)
- Draught: 13 ft (4.0 m)
- Installed power: 3,500 ihp (2,600 kW)
- Propulsion: 2 × 3-cylinder vertical triple-expansion steam engines; Locomotive boilers; Twin screws
- Speed: 18.2 knots (33.7 km/h; 20.9 mph)
- Complement: 120
- Armament: 2 × QF 4.7-inch (12 cm) guns; 4 × 6-pounder; 1 × Nordenfelt machine gun; 5 × 18-inch torpedo tubes; On conversion to a minesweeper in 1914 two torpedo tubes were removed

The sixth HMS Harrier was a Dryad-class torpedo gunboat. She was launched at Devonport Dockyard on 20 February 1894, and saw service in the Mediterranean and in fishery protection. She served as a minesweeper during World War I and was sold for commercial use in 1920.

== Design ==
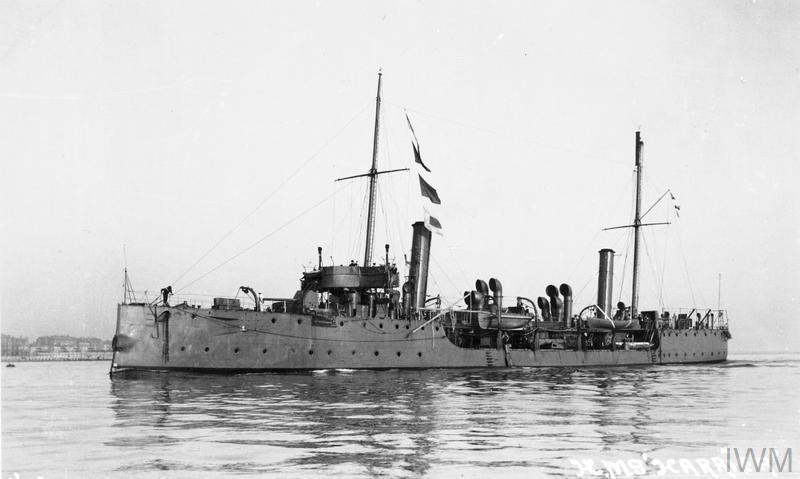
Torpedo gunboat HMS Harrier

Ordered under the Naval Defence Act of 1889, which established the "Two-Power Standard", the class was contemporary with the first torpedo boat destroyers. With a length overall of 262 ft 6 in (80.01 m), a beam of 30 ft 6 in (9.30 m) and a displacement of 1,070 tons, these torpedo gunboats were not small ships by the standard of the time; they were larger than the majority of World War I destroyers. Harrier was engined by Hawthorn Leslie and Company with two sets of vertical triple-expansion steam engines, two locomotive-type boilers, and twin screws. This layout produced 3,500 indicated horsepower (2,600 kW), giving her a speed of 18.2 knots (33.7 km/h). She carried between 100 and 160 tons of coal and was manned by 120 sailors and officers.

== Armament ==
The armament when built comprised two QF 4.7-inch (12 cm) guns, four 6-pdr guns and a single 5-barrelled Nordenfelt machine gun. Her primary weapon was five 18-inch (450-mm) torpedo tubes, (Note: British "18 inch" torpedoes were 17.72 inches (45.0 cm) in diameter) with two reloads. On conversion to a minesweeper in 1914 two of the five torpedoes were removed.

== History ==
=== Mediterranean service ===
Harrier's first commission was spent on the Mediterranean Station. She deployed to Crete in February 1897 to operate as part of the International Squadron, a multinational force made up of ships of the Austro-Hungarian Navy, French Navy, Imperial German Navy, Italian Royal Navy (Regia Marina), Imperial Russian Navy, and Royal Navy that intervened in the 1897-1898 Greek uprising on Crete against rule by the Ottoman Empire. On 21 February 1897, she joined the British battleship HMS Revenge and torpedo gunboat HMS Dryad, the Russian battleship Imperator Aleksandr II, the Austro-Hungarian armored cruiser SMS Kaiserin und Königin Maria Theresia, and the German protected cruiser SMS Kaiserin Augusta in the International Squadron's first direct offensive action, a brief bombardment of Cretan insurgent positions on the heights east of Canea (now Chania) after the insurgents refused the squadron′s order to take down a Greek flag they had raised.

Lieutenant Commander Philip Walter was appointed in command in July 1897. She left Port Said for Malta on 8 February 1900, arrived at Plymouth on 1 March, and on 24 March 1900 paid off at Devonport, where she was placed in the B division of the Fleet Reserve. Commander Cyril Everard Tower was appointed in command on 11 March 1901, following which she again returned to the Mediterranean Station, and in late November 1901 replaced the Mariner-class gunvessel Melita as the special service vessel at Constantinople. She visited the Danube in early 1902, and was ordered to the Persian Gulf on special service in June that year. After a brief visit to the Mediterranean in September for combined manoeuvres off Nauplia, she was back in the Gulf visiting Aden and Perim the following month, then Hodeida in December.

=== Fishery protection and tender to the Navigation School ===
She spent some time before World War I engaged in fishery protection duties and was for a time a tender to the Navigation School.

=== Conversion to a minesweeper ===
At the outbreak of war she was converted at Portsmouth, in common with most of the rest of her class, to the minesweeping role.

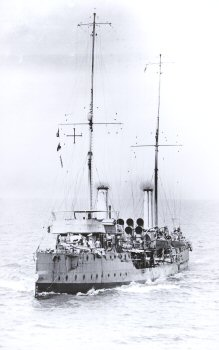
Harrier in wartime grey paint scheme

== Disposal ==
She was sold to T R Sales at Haulbowline, Cork on 23 February 1920 for commercial use.

== Bibliography ==
- Brown, Les (2023). Royal Navy Torpedo Vessels. Barnsley, UK: Seaforth Publishing. ISBN 978-1-3990-2285-9.
- Colledge, J. J.; Warlow, Ben (2006) [1969]. Ships of the Royal Navy: The Complete Record of All Fighting Ships of the Royal Navy from the 15th Century to the Present (3rd Rev ed.). London: Chatham Publishing. ISBN 978-1-86176-281-8. OCLC 67375475.
- McTiernan, Mick, A Very Bad Place Indeed For a Soldier. The British involvement in the early stages of the European Intervention in Crete. 1897 - 1898, King's College, London, September 2014.
- Lyon, David & Winfield, Rif (2004). The Sail and Steam Navy List: All the Ships of the Royal Navy 1815–1889. Chatham Publishing. ISBN 978-1-86176-032-6. OCLC 52620555.
