= HMS Dryad (1893) =

Gunboat of the Royal Navy

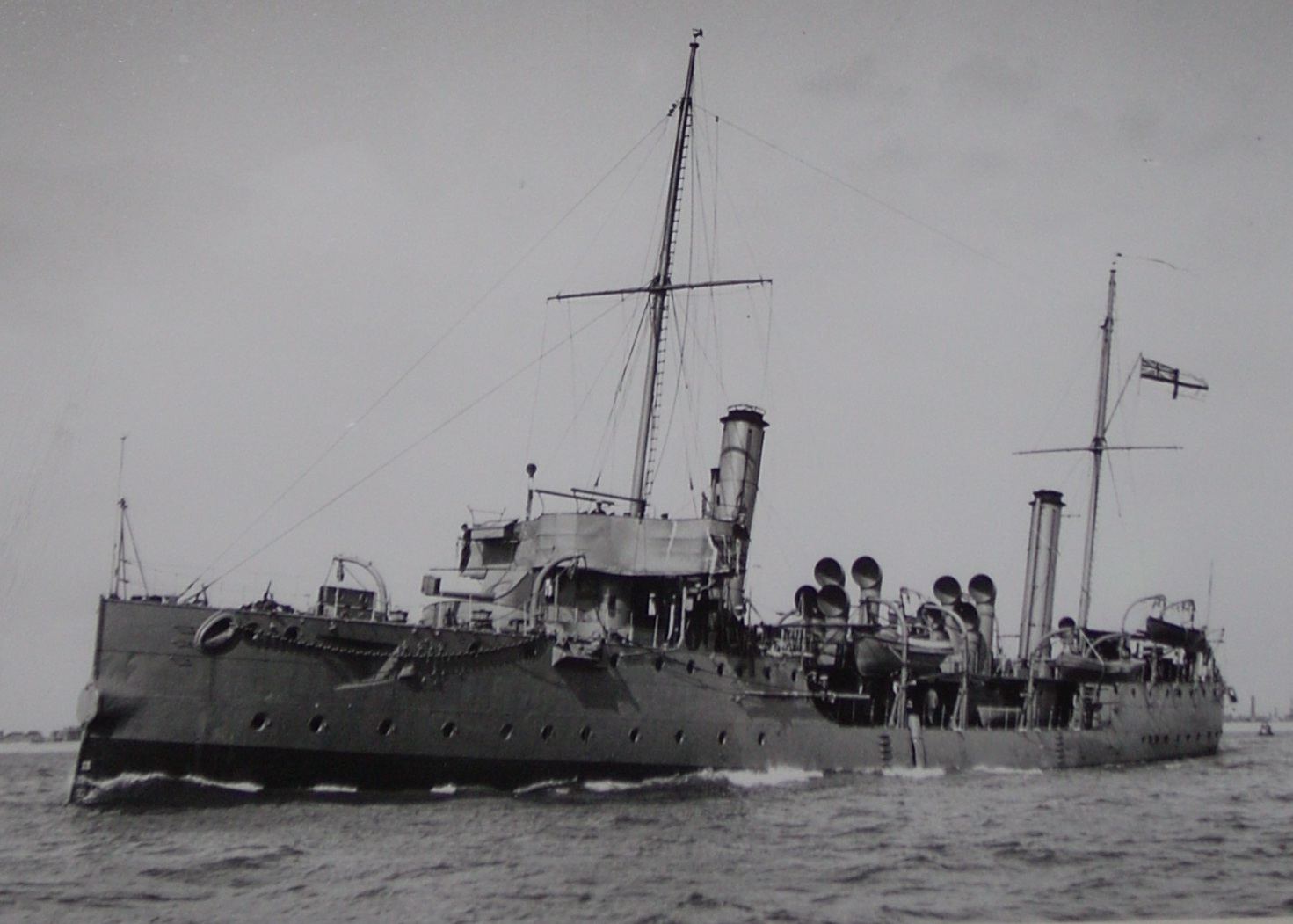
- Dryad underway in wartime grey paint

History

United Kingdom
- Name: Dryad
- Builder: Chatham Dockyard
- Laid down: 15 April 1893
- Launched: 22 November 1893
- Commissioned: 21 July 1894
- Renamed: HMS Hamadryad in 1918
- Fate: Broken up in 1920

General characteristics
- Class & type: Dryad-class torpedo gunboat
- Displacement: 1070 tons
- Length: 262 ft 6 in (80.0 m)
- Beam: 30 ft 6 in (9.3 m)
- Draught: 13 ft (4.0 m)
- Installed power: 3,500 ihp (2,600 kW)
- Propulsion: 2 × 3-cylinder vertical triple-expansion steam engines; Locomotive boilers; Twin screws
- Speed: 18.2 kn (33.7 km/h)
- Complement: 120
- Armament: 2 × QF 4.7-inch (12 cm) guns; 4 × 6-pounder; 1 × Nordenfelt machine gun; 5 × 18-inch torpedo tubes; On conversion to a minesweeper in 1914 two torpedo tubes were removed

HMS Dryad was the name ship of the Dryad-class torpedo gunboats. She was launched at Chatham Dockyard on 22 November 1893, the first of the class to be completed. She served as a minesweeper during World War I and was broken up in 1920.

== Design ==
Ordered under the Naval Defence Act of 1889, which established the "Two-Power Standard", the class was contemporary with the first torpedo boat destroyers. With a length overall of 262 ft 6 in (80.01 m), a beam of 30 ft 6 in (9.30 m) and a displacement of 1,070 tons, these torpedo gunboats were not small ships by the standard of the time; they were larger than the majority of World War I destroyers. Dryad was engined by Maudslay, Sons & Field with two sets of vertical triple-expansion steam engines, two locomotive-type boilers, and twin screws. This layout produced 3,500 indicated horsepower (2,600 kW), giving her a speed of 18.2 knots (33.7 km/h). She carried between 100 and 160 tons of coal and was manned by 120 sailors and officers.

== Armament ==
The armament when built comprised two QF 4.7-inch (12 cm) guns, four 6-pounder guns and a single 5-barrelled Nordenfelt machine gun. Her primary weapon was five 18-inch (450-mm) torpedo tubes, (Note: British "18 inch" torpedoes were 17.72 inches (45.0 cm) in diameter) with two reloads. On conversion to a minesweeper in 1914 two of the five torpedoes were removed.

== Service history ==
=== Mediterranean service ===
Dryad deployed to Crete in February 1897 to operate as part of the International Squadron, a multinational force made up of ships of the Austro-Hungarian Navy, French Navy, Imperial German Navy, Italian Royal Navy (Regia Marina), Imperial Russian Navy, and Royal Navy that intervened in the 1897–1898 Greek uprising on Crete against rule by the Ottoman Empire. On 21 February 1897, she joined the British battleship HMS Revenge and torpedo gunboat HMS Harrier, the Russian battleship Imperator Aleksandr II, the Austro-Hungarian armored cruiser SMS Kaiserin und Königin Maria Theresia, and the German protected cruiser SMS Kaiserin Augusta in the International Squadron's first direct offensive action, a brief bombardment of Cretan insurgent positions on the heights east of Canea (now Chania) after the insurgents refused the squadron's order to take down a Greek flag they had raised.

In December 1899, Dryad was commissioned for more service on the Mediterranean Station. On 14 January 1900 Dryad left Chatham for the Mediterranean in order to relieve Hussar, which returned to Devonport to pay off. She was stationed at Souda Bay until March 1900, when she returned to the station garrison at Malta. Later the same month she was posted to Alexandria as a port ship. In June 1902 she was lent to the East Indies Squadron for special service in the Gulf of Aden, returning to Malta in late September. She paid off at station headquarters at Malta on 4 February 1903, then recommissioned the following day.

=== Tender to the Navigation School ===
In 1906 she was chosen as the tender to the Navigation School, conducting navigation training of officers at sea. In due course her name came to be used for the Navigation School itself, and then for HMS Dryad, the shore establishment at Southwick House in Hampshire.

On 20 June 1907, Dryad rescued the crew of HM Torpedo Boat 99 after the torpedo boat sank without loss of life during afternoon steam trials in the English Channel off Torquay, England, when her propeller shaft broke and punctured her hull.

=== Wartime service as a minesweeper ===
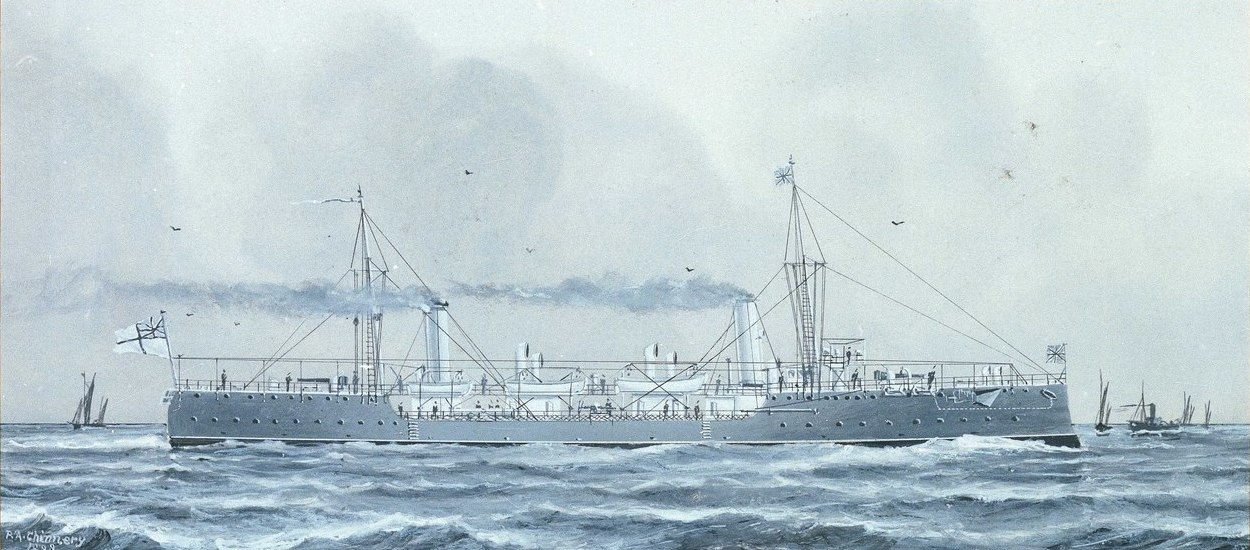
HMS Dryad Floated at Chatham, 25 November 1893, by Miss Cecil Heneage, Daughter of Sir Algernon C F Heneage, KCB

By 1914 Dryad had been converted to a minesweeper and was operating in the North Sea from the port of Lowestoft. Four gunners from Dryad were assigned to the Q-ship Inverlyon. which on 15 August 1915 sank the German submarine UB-4 with gunfire.

== Disposal ==
She was renamed Hamadryad in 1918 and was sold to H Auten & Co on 24 September 1920 for breaking.

== Bibliography ==
- Colledge, J. J.; Warlow, Ben (2006) [1969]. Ships of the Royal Navy: The Complete Record of All Fighting Ships of the Royal Navy from the 15th Century to the Present (3rd Rev ed.). London: Chatham Publishing. ISBN 978-1-86176-281-8. OCLC 67375475.
- Brown, Les (2023). Royal Navy Torpedo Vessels. Barnsley, UK: Seaforth Publishing. ISBN 978-1-3990-2285-9.
- McTiernan, Mick, A Very Bad Place Indeed For a Soldier. The British involvement in the early stages of the European Intervention in Crete. 1897 - 1898, King's College, London, September 2014.
- Lyon, David & Winfield, Rif (2004). The Sail and Steam Navy List: All the Ships of the Royal Navy 1815–1889. Chatham Publishing. ISBN 978-1-86176-032-6. OCLC 52620555.
