= HMS A3 =

A-class submarine of the Royal Navy

Coordinates: 50°31.41′N 2°11.25′W

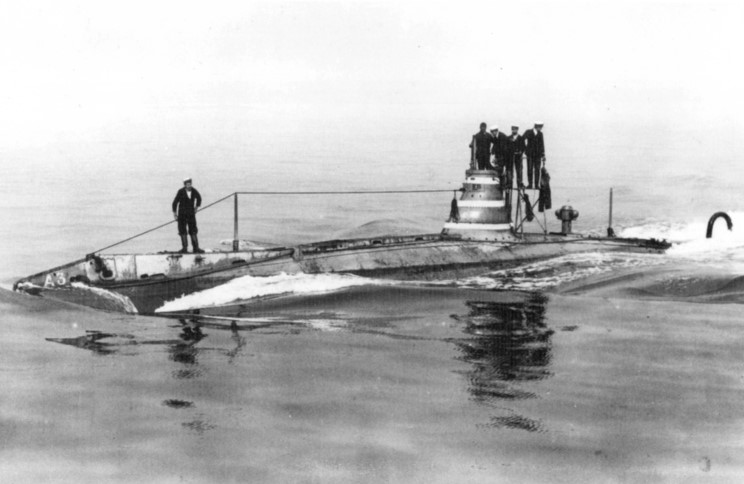
- HMS A3

History

United Kingdom
- Name: HMS A3
- Builder: Vickers, Sons & Maxim, Barrow-in-Furness
- Yard number: 295
- Laid down: 6 November 1902
- Launched: 9 May 1903
- Commissioned: 13 July 1904
- Fate: Sunk in collision 2 February 1912; Refloated; Sunk as target 17 May 1912

General characteristics
- Class & type: A-class submarine
- Displacement: 190 long tons (193 t) surfaced; 206 long tons (209 t) submerged
- Length: 105 ft (32.0 m)
- Beam: 12 ft 9 in (3.9 m)
- Draught: 10 ft 8 in (3.3 m)
- Installed power: 450 bhp (340 kW) (petrol engine); 150 hp (110 kW) (electric motor)
- Propulsion: 1 × 16-cylinder Wolseley petrol engine; 1 × electric motor
- Speed: 10 knots (19 km/h; 12 mph) surfaced; 7 knots (13 km/h; 8.1 mph) submerged
- Range: 320 nautical miles (590 km; 370 mi) at 10 kn (19 km/h; 12 mph) surfaced
- Complement: 2 officers and 9 ratings
- Armament: 2 × 18-inch (45 cm) torpedo tubes

HMS A3 was an A-class submarine built for the Royal Navy in the first decade of the 20th century. She sank in 1912. The wreck is a Protected Wreck managed by Historic England.

== Design and description ==
A3 was a member of the first British class of submarines, although slightly larger, faster and more heavily armed than the lead ship, HMS A1. The submarine had a length of 105 feet 1 inch (32.0 m) overall, a beam of 12 feet 9 inches (3.9 m) and a mean draught of 10 feet 8 inches (3.3 m). They displaced 190 long tons (190 t) on the surface and 206 long tons (209 t) submerged. The A-class submarines had a crew of 2 officers and 9 ratings.

For surface running, the boats were powered by a single 16-cylinder 450-brake-horsepower (336 kW) Wolseley petrol engine that drove one propeller shaft. When submerged the propeller was driven by a 150-horsepower (112 kW) electric motor. They could reach 10 knots (19 km/h; 12 mph) on the surface and 7 knots (13 km/h; 8.1 mph) underwater. On the surface, A3 had a range of 320 nautical miles (590 km; 370 mi) at 10 knots (19 km/h; 12 mph); the boat had a range of 30 nautical miles (56 km; 35 mi) at 5 knots (9.3 km/h; 5.8 mph) submerged.

The boats were armed with two 18-inch (45 cm) torpedo tubes in the bow. They could carry a pair of reload torpedoes, but generally did not as doing so that they had to compensate for their weight by an equivalent weight of fuel.

== Construction and career ==
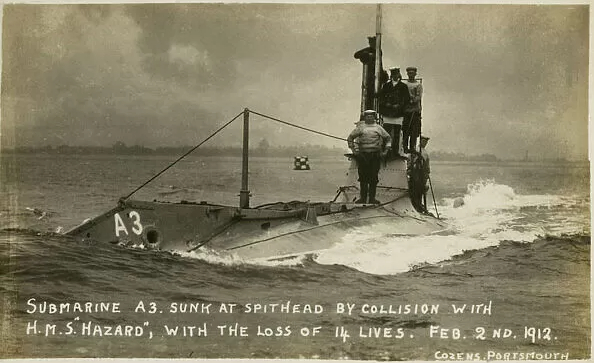
Submarine A3. Sunk at Spithead by collision with HMS Hazard, with the loss of 14 lives, 2 February 1912

A3 was laid down by Vickers, Sons & Maxim as Yard No.295 at Barrow-in-Furness on 6 November 1902 and was launched on 9 May 1903. She was commissioned on 13 July 1904. She primarily served as a coastal defense and training submarine in her over seven years of service.

On 2 February 1912, A3, along with several other submarines dispatched from the port of Gosport, conducted training exercises on target ships in the Solent. Whilst attacking the depot ship HMS Hazard, the semi-submerged A3 accidentally collided with its target 2 nautical miles (3.7 km; 2.3 mi) southwest of the East Princessa Buoy in the eastern Solent. Its rudder and propeller were both disabled, and the holed submarine sank immediately with all 14 hands lost. The King sent his immediate condolences to the families of the lost seamen.

The submarine was raised from the bottom on 11 March and was brought into the south lock of Portsmouth dockyard the following day, slung below a salvage lighter; the lock was pumped dry so that the 14 bodies could be recovered and the damages surveyed.

After being towed from Portsmouth to Portland Naval Dockyard, the wreck was towed offshore into Weymouth Bay and, after some technical experiments on the hull, it was sunk as a gunnery target by shells from HMS St. Vincent on 17 May 1912. In July 2016 the wreck of A3 was officially designated as a protected site.
