= Russian battleship Imperator Aleksandr II =

Russian battleship in the 1880s

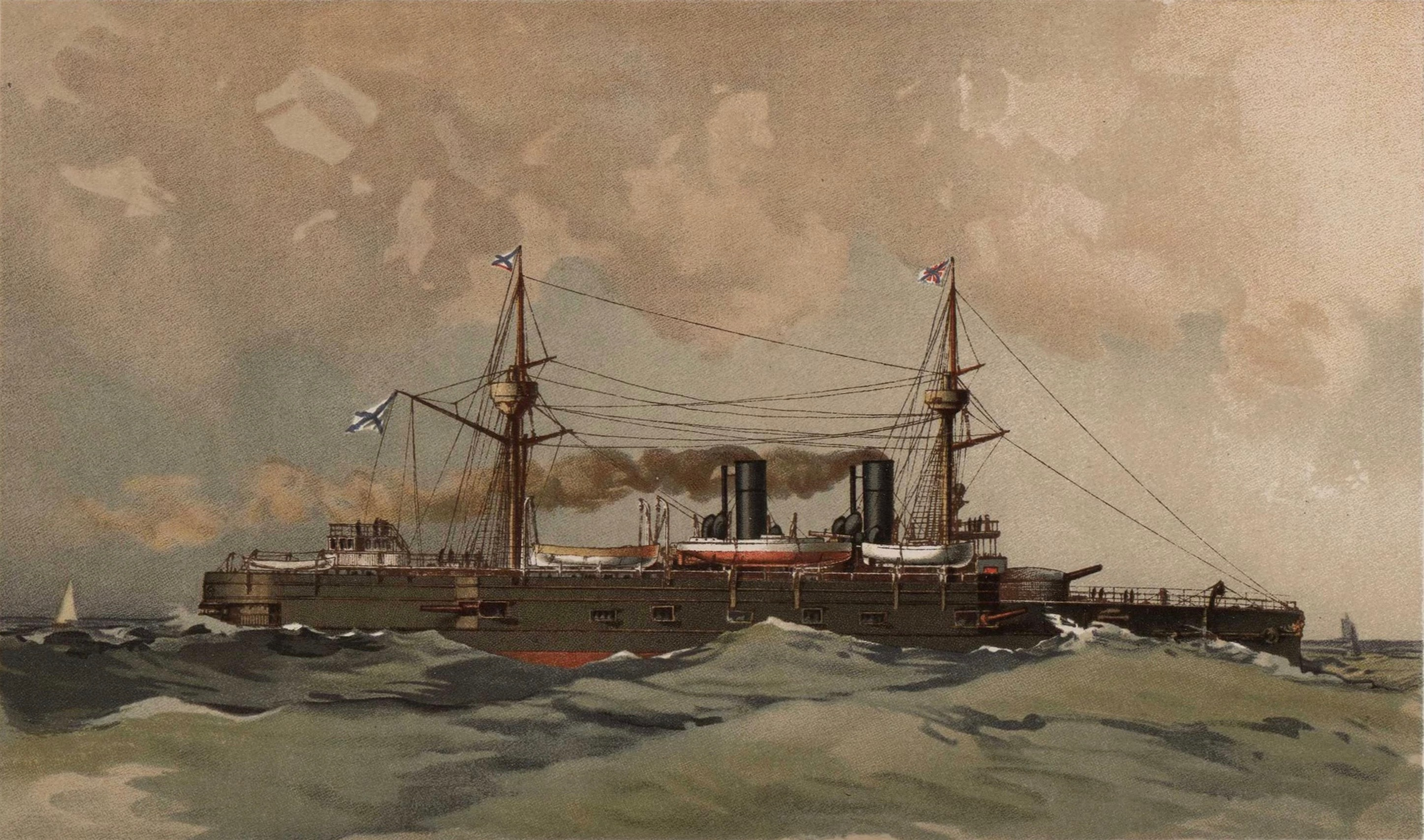
- Imperator Aleksandr II as depicted by an 1893 lithograph

History

Russian Empire
- Name: Imperator Aleksandr II
- Namesake: Alexander II
- Builder: New Admiralty Yard, Saint Petersburg
- Laid down: 12 July 1885
- Launched: 13 July 1887
- Commissioned: June 1891
- Out of service: 21 May 1921
- Renamed: Zarya Svobody about 9 May 1917
- Fate: Sold for scrapping 22 August 1922

General characteristics
- Class & type: Imperator Aleksandr II-class battleship
- Displacement: 9,244 long tons (9,392 t)
- Length: 346 ft 6 in (105.61 m)
- Beam: 66 ft 11 in (20.40 m)
- Draught: 25 ft 9 in (7.85 m)
- Installed power: 8,289 ihp (6,181 kW)
- Propulsion: 2 shaft vertical compound steam engines, 12 cylindrical boilers
- Speed: 15.27 knots (28.28 km/h; 17.57 mph)
- Range: 4,400 nautical miles (8,100 km) at 8 knots (15 km/h; 9.2 mph)
- Complement: 616
- Armament: 1 × 2 – 12-inch (305 mm) guns; 4 × 1 – 9-inch (229 mm) guns; 8 × 1 – 6-inch (152 mm) guns; 10 × 1 – 47-millimetre (1.9 in) Hotchkiss revolving cannon; 8 × 1 – 37-millimetre (1.5 in) Hotchkiss revolving cannon; 5 × 1 – 15-inch (381 mm) torpedo tubes
- Armour: Compound armour; Belt: 4–14 in (102–356 mm); Deck: 2.5 in (64 mm); Barbette: 10 in (254 mm); Barbette hood: 3 in (76 mm); Conning tower: 8 in (203 mm); Bulkheads: 6 in (152 mm)

Imperator Aleksandr II (Russian: Император Александр II) was a Russian Imperator Aleksandr II-class battleship built for the Imperial Russian Navy in the 1880s. She was an artillery training ship assigned to the Baltic Fleet by the time of the Russo-Japanese War of 1905 and was not sent to the Pacific as was most of the rest of the Baltic Fleet. She was inactive at Kronstadt during World War I, but her crew was active in the revolutionary movement. She was turned over to the Kronstadt port authority on 21 April 1921 before she was sold for scrap on 22 August 1922. She was towed to Germany during the autumn of 1922, but was not stricken from the Navy List until 21 November 1925.

== Description ==
Imperator Aleksandr II was named after the Emperor Alexander II of Russia. She was built by the New Admiralty Yard at Saint Petersburg. She was laid down in June 1885, launched in July 1887, and completed in June 1891, although her trials lasted until the spring of 1892.

She was 334 feet (101.8 m) long at the waterline and 346 feet 6 inches (105.6 m) long overall. She had a beam of 66 feet 11 inches (20.40 m) and a draft of 25 feet 9 inches (7.85 m). She displaced 9,244 long tons (9,392 t) at load, over 800 long tons (813 t) more than her designed displacement of 8,440 long tons (8,575 t).

Imperator Aleksandr II had two three-cylinder vertical compound steam engines driving 17-foot (5.2 m) screw propellers. Twelve cylindrical boilers provided steam to the engines. Her engines were built by Baltic Works and had a total designed output of 8,500 indicated horsepower (6,338 kW). On trials, the powerplant produced 8,289 ihp (6,181 kW), and a top speed of 15.27 knots (28.28 km/h; 17.57 mph). She carried 967 long tons (983 t) of coal that provided a range of 4,400 nautical miles (8,100 km) at a speed of 8 knots (15 km/h; 9.2 mph) and 1,770 nautical miles (3,280 km) at a speed of 15 knots (28 km/h; 17 mph).

The main armament of the Imperator Aleksandr II-class ships was a pair of 12-inch (305 mm) Obukhov Model 1877 30-calibre guns mounted in a twin barbette mount forward. The four 9-inch (229 mm) Obukhov Model 1877 35-calibre guns were on center-pivot mounts in casemates at the corners of the citadel, the hull being recessed to increase their arcs of fire ahead or behind. The eight 6-inch (152 mm) Model 1877 35-calibre guns were mounted on broadside pivot mounts. Four were fitted between the 9-inch guns and could traverse a total of 100°. The others were mounted at each end of the ship where they could fire directly ahead or astern. The ten 47-millimetre (1.9 in) Hotchkiss revolving cannon were mounted in hull embrasures of the ship between the nine and six-inch guns to defend against torpedo boats. Four 37-millimetre (1.5 in) Hotchkiss revolving cannon were mounted in each fighting top. Imperator Aleksandr II carried five above-water 15-inch (381 mm) torpedo tubes, two in the bow, one on each side of the stempost, one tube on each broadside and a tube in the stern. Smaller 14-inch (356 mm) torpedo tubes could be mounted in four of the ship's cutters. Thirty-six mines could also be carried.

== History ==
Imperator Aleksandr II served in the Baltic Fleet and along with the cruiser Rurik represented Russia at the opening of the Kiel Canal in Germany in June 1895. She ran aground in Vyborg Bay later that year, but sustained little damage. She joined the Mediterranean Squadron in August 1896. She deployed to Crete in February 1897 to operate as part of the International Squadron, a multinational force made up of ships of the Austro-Hungarian Navy, French Navy, Imperial German Navy, Italian Royal Navy (Regia Marina), Imperial Russian Navy, and Royal Navy that intervened in the 1897–1898 Greek uprising on Crete against rule by the Ottoman Empire. On 21 February 1897, she joined the British battleship HMS Revenge and torpedo gunboats HMS Dryad and HMS Harrier, the Austro-Hungarian armored cruiser SMS Kaiserin und Königin Maria Theresia, and the German protected cruiser SMS Kaiserin Augusta in the International Squadron's first direct offensive action, a brief bombardment of Cretan insurgent positions on the heights east of Canea (now Chania) after the insurgents refused the squadron's order to take down a Greek flag they had raised.

Imperator Aleksandr II returned to Kronstadt in September 1901. She was reboilered in December 1903 and modified in 1904 to serve as an artillery school ship. Her crew refused to suppress the mutinous garrison of Fort Konstantin defending Kronstadt in August 1906. She was assigned to the Artillery Training Detachment in 1907. She spent most of World War I in Kronstadt where her crew was active in the revolutionary movement. She was renamed Zarya Svobody (Заря Свободы—Dawn of Freedom) in May 1917. She was turned over to the Kronstadt port authority on 21 April 1921 before she was sold for scrap on 22 August 1922. She was towed to Germany during the autumn of 1922, but was not stricken from the Navy List until 21 November 1925.

Conway's says that she was reconstructed in France between 1902 and 1904, with her torpedo tubes removed and her six and nine-inch guns exchanged for five 8-inch (200 mm) 45 calibre guns and eight six-inch 45 calibre guns. Her revolving cannon were also exchanged for ten three-pounder guns. Arbazov confirms that the torpedo tubes were removed and says that she had her nine-inch guns replaced by five 8-inch, the fifth being placed at the stern, the old six-inch guns were exchanged for newer, more powerful models, and four 47-mm and four 120-mm guns were added on the upper deck, presumably replacing the old revolving cannon.

== Bibliography ==
- Arbuzov, V. V. (1997). Bronenoset︠s︡ Imperator Aleksandr II. Bronenost︠s︡y russkogo flota (in Russian). Vol. 4. Saint Petersburg: Izd. alʹmanakha "Korabli i srazhenii︠a︡.
- Gardiner, Robert, ed. (1979). Conway's All the World's Fighting Ships 1860–1905. New York: Mayflower Books. ISBN 0-8317-0302-4.
- McTiernan, Mick, A Very Bad Place Indeed For a Soldier. The British involvement in the early stages of the European Intervention in Crete. 1897–1898, King's College, London, September 2014.
- McLaughlin, Stephen (2003). Russian & Soviet Battleships. Annapolis, MD: Naval Institute Press. ISBN 1-55750-481-4.

=== Further reading ===
- А.Б. Широкорад. Корабельная артиллерия российского флота 1867–1922 г. «Морская коллекция» No. 2 за 1997 год.
- Моисеев С. П. Список кораблей русского парового и броненосного флота 1861–1917 г. М., Воениздат, 1948
- Чертеж ЭБР «Император Николай I». Тверь, «Ретро-Флот», 1993
- Вторая тихоокеанская эскадра. «Наваль», вып. 1, с. 24–29. М., 1991
- А.А. Белов «Броненосцы Японии». Серия "Боевые корабли мира"
