= Chilean torpedo gunboat Almirante Simpson =

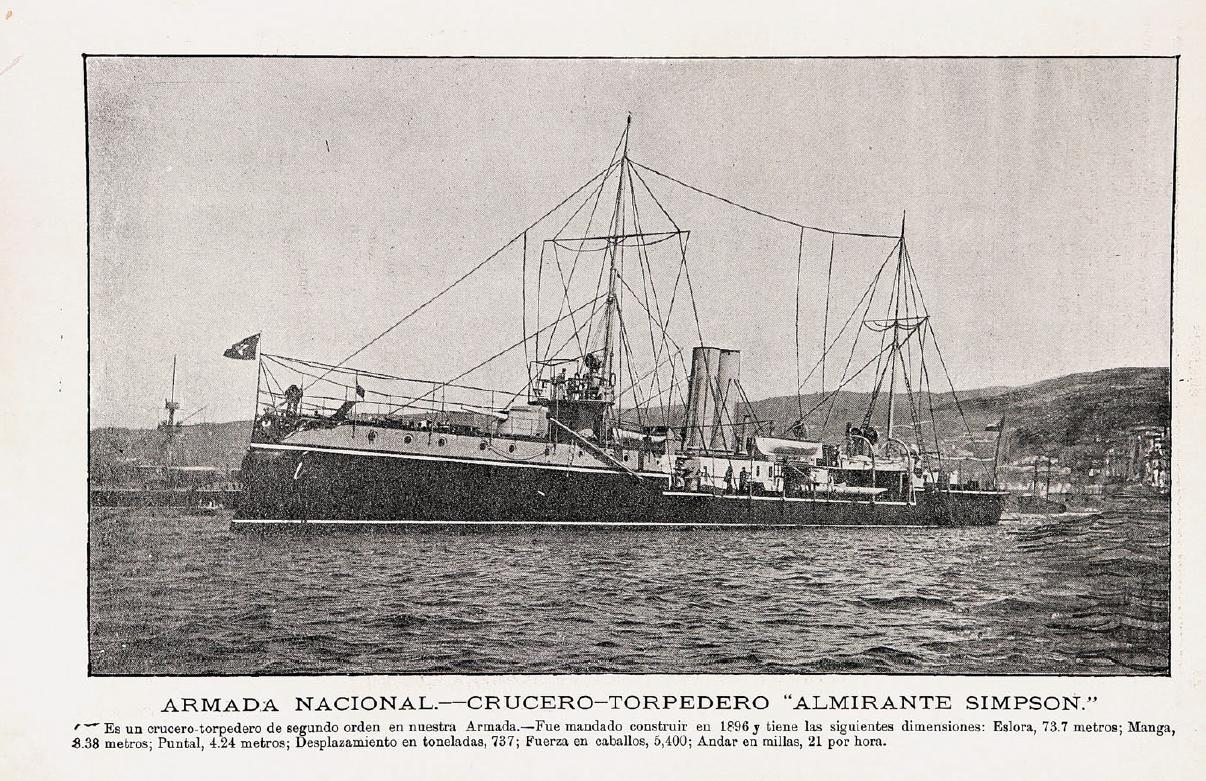
- Almirante Simpson in 1904

History

Chile
- Name: Almirante Simpson
- Namesake: Roberto Simpson Winthrop
- Builder: Laird Brothers, Birkenhead
- Cost: £67,000
- Laid down: 1895
- Launched: 1896
- Commissioned: 1897
- Decommissioned: 1907
- Fate: Transferred to Ecuador in 1907

Ecuador
- Renamed: Libertador Bolívar
- Namesake: Simón Bolívar
- Acquired: 1907
- Commissioned: 1907
- Out of service: 1917
- Fate: Sank in the Guayas River in 1928 due to poor condition

General characteristics
- Type: Torpedo gunboat
- Displacement: 800 t / 858 t
- Length: 73.15 m (240 ft)
- Beam: 8.38 m (27.5 ft)
- Draught: 4.27 m (14.0 ft) max
- Depth: 4.6 m (15 ft)
- Installed power: 4 boilers; 4,500 ihp (3,400 kW)
- Propulsion: 2 × shafts; 2 × triple-expansion steam engines
- Speed: 21.5 knots (24.7 mph; 39.8 km/h)
- Complement: 128 (peacetime); 166 (wartime)
- Armament: 2 × 120 mm (4.7 in) guns; 4 × 47 mm (1.9 in) guns; 3 × 450 mm (18 in) torpedo tubes
- Armour: Bridge - bunkers: 25.4 mm (1.00 in); Engines - boilers: 25 mm (0.98 in); Guns: 114.3 mm (4.50 in)

Almirante Simpson was a unique design of torpedo gunboat, built by the British shipyard Laird Brothers. Acquired by the Chilean Navy in 1895, during construction. The ship had a brief service in Chile, being transferred to the Ecuadorian Navy in 1907 and renamed Libertador Bolívar. She was the first Ecuadorian warship of the 20th century and had an important participation in the Ecuadorian Civil War of 1913–1916. After the war, the ship was retired and then sank in 1928.

== Acquisition ==
After the Chilean Civil War of 1891, the government of President Jorge Montt (1891–1896) carried out a naval acquisition plan to repower the Chilean Navy, which was also necessary due to the naval arms race with Argentina. Thus, in 1895 the Montt government ordered the construction of several ships in England. (Note: The cruisers Esmeralda and Ministro Zenteno, four Capitán Orella-class destroyers, six Ingeniero Hyatt-class torpedo boats, and the training ship General Baquedano were built in England for the Chilean Navy. The Almirante Simpson torpedo gunboat was also purchased.)

In 1895, construction began at the British shipyard Laird Brothers, in Birkenhead, of a torpedo gunboat for the Royal Navy to be called Lion. But on 30 August of that year, during construction, the ship was bought by the Chilean government for £67,000, as part of new naval acquisitions. She was renamed Almirante Simpson in honor of Roberto Simpson Winthrop.

== Design and description ==
=== Type ===
The Almirante Simpson belongs to the first generation of destroyers of the late 19th century, the so-called torpedo gunboats that were designed to hunt and destroy torpedo boats. But this ship is sometimes considered a torpedo cruiser.

The shipyard Laird Brothers, was one of the British shipyards that worked on the design and construction of the first British destroyers. He was also contracted to build the first ships of this type for the Chilean Navy in the 1880s, the two Almirante Lynch-class torpedo gunboats. The Almirante Lynch-class carried out the world's first successful attack with self-propelled torpedoes, sinking the ironclad Blanco Encalada at the battle of Caldera Bay during the Chilean Civil War of 1891. This fact showed the world that this type of ship also had the capability to destroy ironclad warships.

=== Characteristics ===
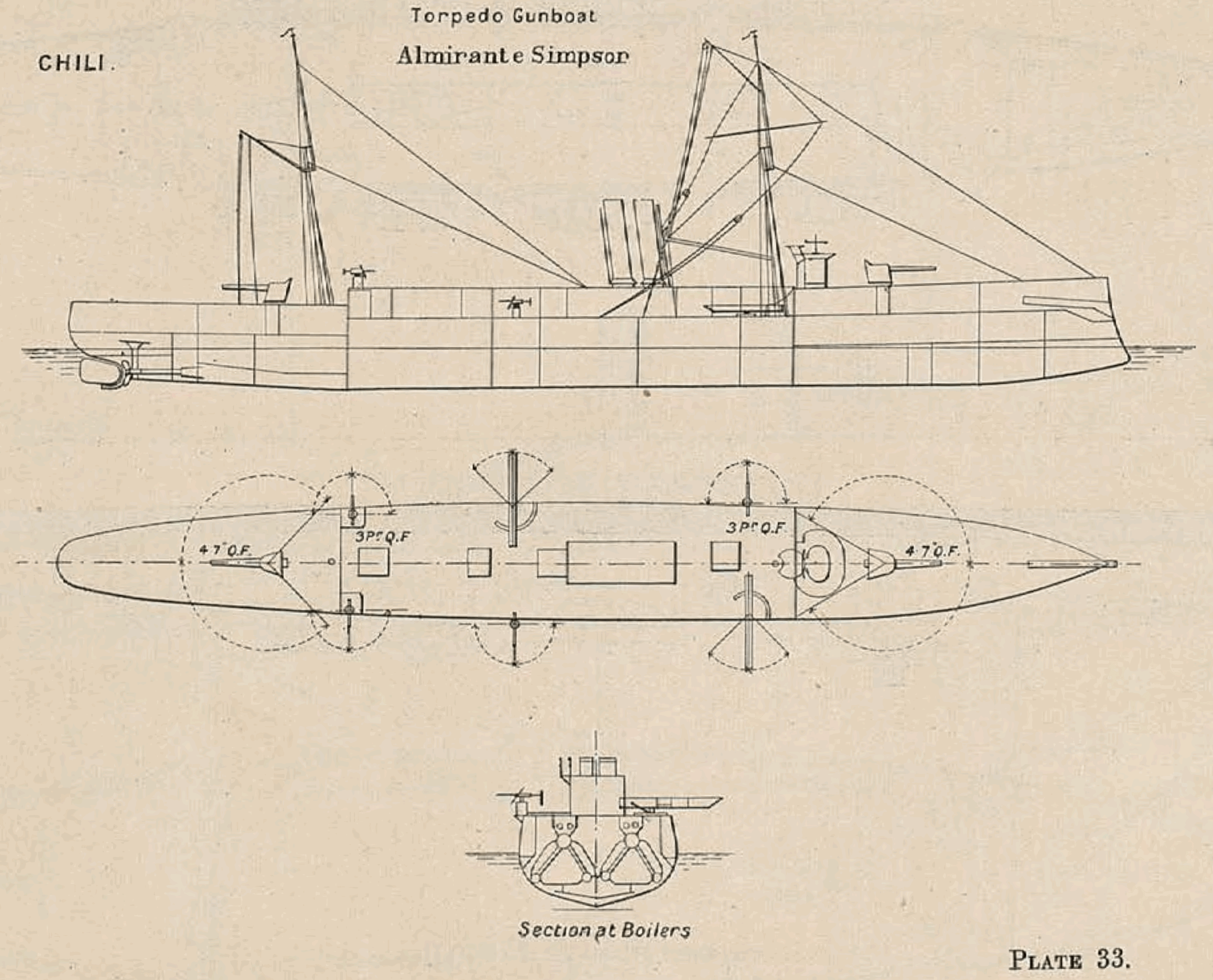
Plans of Almirante Simpson as drawn for Brassey's Naval Annual of 1897

This steel-hulled torpedo gunboat was 73.15 m (240 ft) long overall, a beam of 8.38 m (27.5 ft), a max draught of 4.27 m (14.0 ft) and depth of 4.6 m (15 ft). The displacement of 800 or 858 tons, being slightly higher in tonnage than the first destroyers. She had a ram bow, a raised forecastle and poop, two masts and two funnels set very close together. The crew was 128 men in peacetime and 166 men in wartime.

Her propulsion system consisted of two triple-expansion steam engines, powering two screw propellers. She had four Normand-type watertube boilers. The ship could steam at a top speed of 21.5 knots (24.7 mph; 39.8 km/h) from 4,500 ihp (3,400 kW). Although at the time of the transfer to Ecuador, she cannot make more than 19 knots and during World War I about 17 knots. She had a storage capacity for 100 tons of coal.

The ship's armament consisted of two 120 mm Armstrong QF guns, one mounted in the forecastle and one in the poop, and four 47 mm Hotchkiss QF guns. Also, three 18-inch torpedo tubes; one was fixed in the bow, the other was in a trainable mounting ahead of the funnels to starboard, and the third in a trainable mounting abaft the funnels to port.

His armor was made of Harvey steel. The bridge and the bunkers had a protection of 25.4 mm (1.00 in). There was 25 mm (0.98 in) steel plating over the engine and boiler rooms, and the guns had a protection of 114.3 mm (4.50 in).

== Service history ==
=== Career in Chile ===
On 22 March 1897, she sailed from Plymouth to Chile as part of the great fleet of new ships ordered by the Chilean government in 1895, which was commanded by Admiral Luis A. Goñi. (Note: In addition to Almirante Simpson torpedo gunboat, the fleet included the cruisers Esmeralda (Goñi's flagship) and Zenteno, the four Capitan Orella-class destroyers, and two Ingeniero Hyatt-class torpedo boats. Although the torpedo boats had to return to England due to technical problems, and later sailed to Chile with the remaining four torpedo boats of the same class that had been acquired.) Due to the large number of ships that the Chilean Navy had at this time, the fleet was organized into three divisions, with Almirante Simpson integrating the first division. During the year 1898 she participated in the intense period of naval training with the fleet, due to the situation of maximum tension between Chile and Argentina.

After a decade of service in the navy, on 12 September 1907, through Law No. 2,018, the Chilean government authorized the sale of the ship to an allied country. The sale included the two ships of the Almirante Lynch-class, but for various reasons the sale failed. Finally, an agreement was successfully negotiated with the government of Ecuador.

=== Career in Ecuador ===
On 5 November of that year, the governments of Chile and Ecuador reached an agreement for the exchange of ships, in which the first transferred torpedo ship Almirante Simpson and the second the training ship Marañón, ex-Chilean ship previously sold. The torpedo ship was acquired as part of an effort by the government of President Eloy Alfaro to restore the navy, becoming the most important ship acquired at that time. Also acquired in the context of the arrival in Ecuador of the Chilean Naval Mission (1905–1916), which had the function of organizing the navy and turning it into a professional institution.

In that month the torpedo ship arrived in Guayaquil and, upon being received by the naval commander of the Guayas District, she was renamed Libertador Bolívar by decree of President Alfaro. This was the first proper warship of the Ecuadorian Navy in the 20th century. The ship's first commander was Captain Rubén Morales Perón, a Chilean officer in the service of Ecuador. (Note: Upon the arrival of the Chilean Naval Mission in Ecuador, several Chilean officers occupied positions in the naval institution. In the Libertador Bolívar, in addition to the captain, there were several Chilean officers and engineers.) After the acquisition, the Naval Academy Course operated on this ship, and the cadets had to learn to use their modern armament and engines.

In 1909, Libertador Bolívar helped in the transfer of artillery from Guayaquil to Punta de Piedra, to fortify the area. In 1910, during the military tension between Ecuador and Peru, she was enlisted for war and embarked President Alfaro to the conflict zone in the El Oro Province. He also had to guard the maritime border with the aviso ship Tarqui, while that the auxiliary cruiser Cotopaxi and the ships of public and private transport mobilized troops and other military elements. In that same year, after the military tension with Peru, she sailed for Chile to attend the celebrations of the centenary of Chilean independence.

Map of the Esmeraldas Province, where most of the conflict took place

In 1913 a Naval Engineers Course was created on board the ship, but it was later eliminated due to the political and economic situation in the country. In that year the Ecuadorian Civil War of 1913–1916 broke out, so the government of Leónidas Plaza prepared the ship to leave for the conflict zone in the Esmeraldas Province, where the rebel forces led by Carlos Concha were located. During the war, the support of the naval forces was relevant. The rebels conspired to seize the ship, but failed. Libertador Bolívar was initially commanded by Chilean Captain Roberto Stone and later by Ecuadorian Lieutenant Luis F. Auz. She had an important role in the transport of troops, the blockade of the coast, in the two bombardments carried out at the port of Esmeraldas in 1913 and 1914, in the amphibious landings, among other military actions.

After the war, the navy ships were in terrible shape. Libertador Bolívar was the most deteriorated of the navy ships and needed urgent repairs. But the country's economic situation indefinitely postponed the repair of the ship. In 1917, she was disarmed, being out of service. In July 1926 a commission of navy officers was formed to analyze the advisability of rebuilding the ship, concluding that she was irreparable. In 1928 the ship sank in the Guayas River due to the poor condition it had reached, for the time that she was without maintenance or necessary repairs. Libertador Bolívar was only replaced in 1935 by a new ship called Presidente Alfaro, of a lower technical level than the torpedo ship, since it was only a yacht or pleasure vessel converted into a training ship.

== See also ==
- List of decommissioned ships of the Chilean Navy
