= HNoMS Rap (1873) =

Norwegian warship torpedo boat

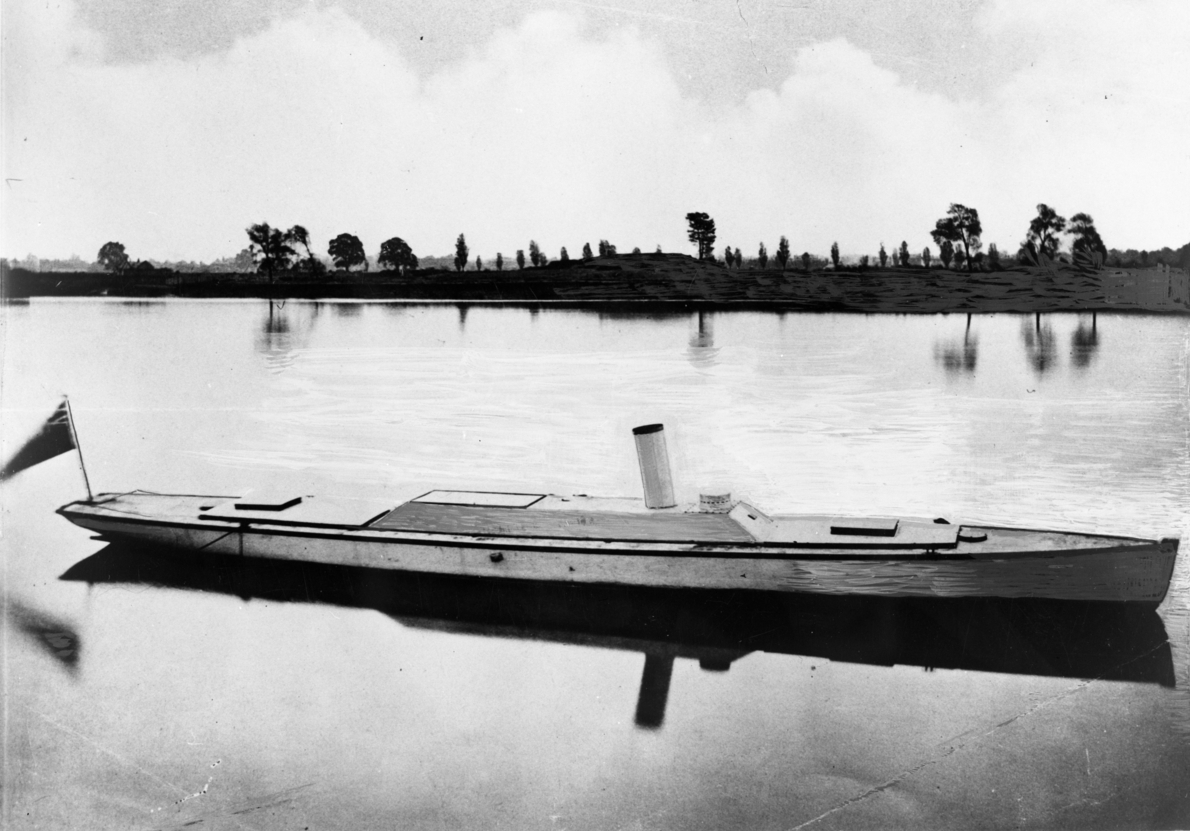
- HNoMS Rap

History

Norway
- Name: KNM Rap
- Ordered: 1873
- Builder: John I. Thornycroft & Company
- Laid down: 1873
- Launched: 1873
- Commissioned: 1873
- Stricken: 1920
- Status: Preserved at the Royal Norwegian Navy Museum

General characteristics
- Type: Torpedo boat
- Displacement: 7 long tons (7 t)
- Length: 18.2 m (59 ft 9 in)
- Beam: 2.4 m (7 ft 10 in)
- Propulsion: Compound steam engine, 100 hp (75 kW)
- Speed: 14.5 knots (16.7 mph; 26.9 km/h)
- Complement: 7
- Armament: Designed for a spar torpedo, later two 'frames' for Whitehead torpedoes

The Norwegian warship HNoMS Rap was a torpedo boat built in 1873. She was one of the first torpedo boats to carry the self-propelled Whitehead torpedo after being converted to use them in 1879, the same year the Royal Navy's HMS Lightning entered service. The name Rap (Rapp in the modern spelling) translates as "quick".

== Design ==
Rap was ordered from Thornycroft shipbuilding company, England, in either 1872 or 1873, and was built at Thornycroft's shipyard at Church Wharf in Chiswick on the River Thames. Managing a speed of 14.5 knots (27 km/h), she was one of the fastest boats afloat when completed. The Norwegians initially planned to arm her with a spar torpedo, but this may never have been fitted. Rap was briefly used for experiments with a towed torpedo before finally being outfitted with launch racks for the new self-propelled Whitehead torpedoes in 1879. Her initial commanding officer was First Lieutenant Koren, who also designed the torpedo racks.

Although Rap had been built several years earlier, the first true torpedo boat built to carry self-propelled torpedoes was the British HMS Lightning, and she was in fact fitted with such torpedoes before Rap. The first warship of any kind to carry self-propelled torpedoes was HMS Vesuvius of 1873.

With a displacement of less than ten tons, Rap was very limited in terms of endurance and seaworthiness. Over the next three decades Rap would be followed by many other Norwegian torpedo boats of ever-increasing size and complexity. She was finally stricken from the fleet in 1920, long after she had become obsolete.

== Gallery ==
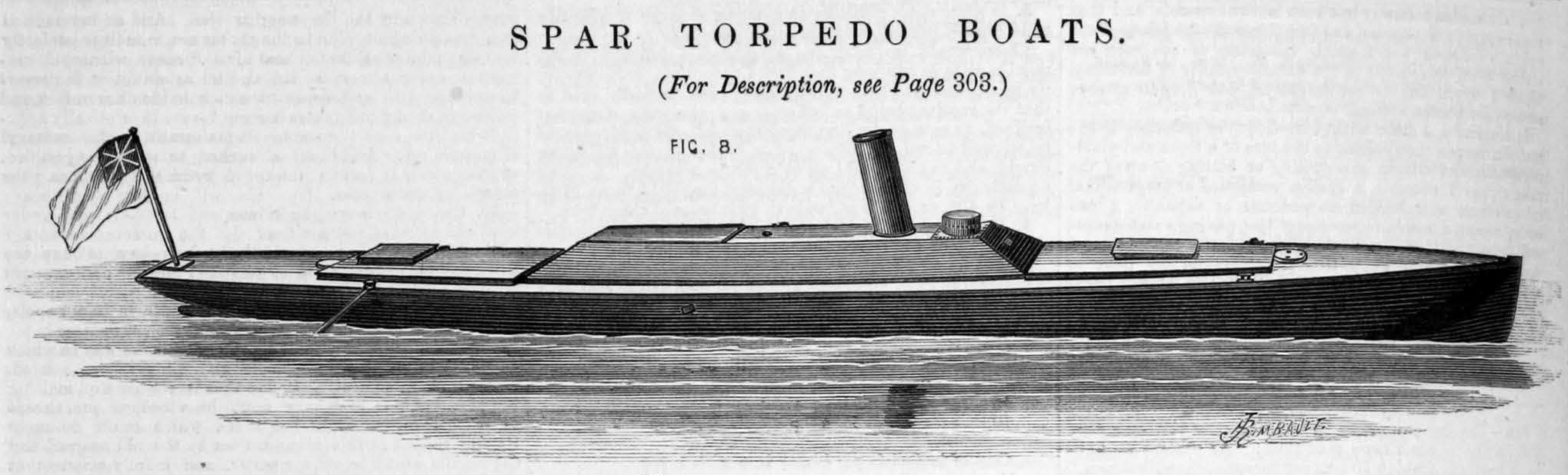
Engraving

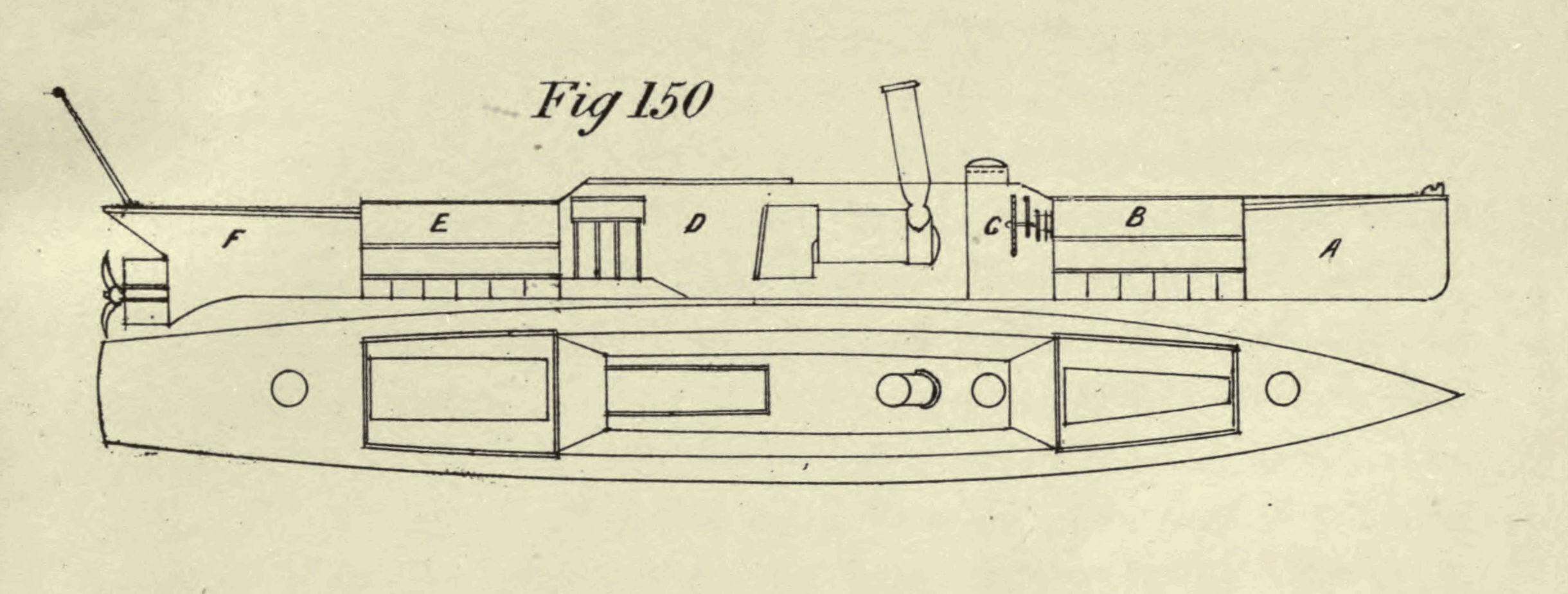
Plan

== Legacy ==
Today, Rap is exhibited at the Naval Museum (Note: The specific location of museum ship Rap within the museum is not available, so the point 59.425556°N 10.486944°E, a central point within the museum, is an approximate location for it) in Horten, Norway.

Rap was also the name given to a class of six motor torpedo boats built for the Royal Norwegian Navy in the 1950s.
