= Battle of Caldera Bay =

Naval battle during the 1891 Chilean Civil War

- Part of the 1891 Chilean Civil War
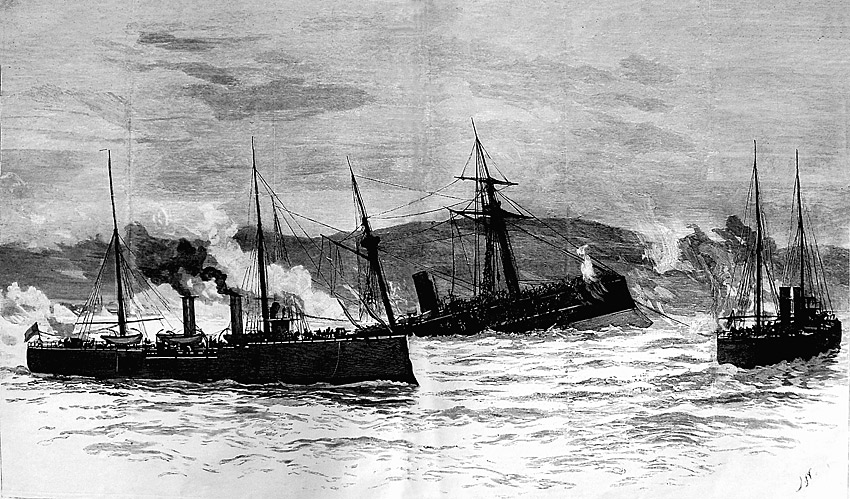
- An outline of the battle in its final stage, when Blanco Encalada sinks because of a torpedo
Date	23 April 1891
Location	Caldera Bay, Chile 27°03′36″S 70°49′39″W
Result	Balmacedist victory

Belligerents
(Chile) Balmaceda Government	(Chile) Congressionist Junta

Commanders and leaders
(Chile) Carlos E. Moraga (Chile) Juan Fuentes	(Chile) Luis A. Goñi

Strength
2 torpedo boats	1 armored frigate 2 transports

Casualties and losses
1 torpedo boat damaged	1 armored frigate sunk 1 transport damaged 182 killed

The Battle of Caldera Bay, or the Sinking of Blanco Encalada, was a naval engagement fought in the Caldera Bay during the 1891 Chilean Civil War between Balmacedist and Congressional naval forces on 23 April 1891. It involved two Balmacedist torpedo boats of the Almirante Lynch-class, and the Congressional armored frigate Blanco Encalada.

After both torpedoes from Almirante Condell had missed, Blanco Encalada was hit by a torpedo from Almirante Lynch and sank in minutes, with the loss of 182 men. The loss of Blanco Encalada hindered the Congressional forces, but they ultimately defeated the Balmacedist forces that August. Blanco Encalada was the first ironclad warship lost to a self-propelled torpedo. The engagement prompted countries to rapidly grow both their torpedo boat and torpedo boat destroyer forces (the latter commonly referred to as destroyers).

== Background ==
In 1891, after a series of struggles about multinational nitrate interests, Chilean President José Manuel Balmaceda refused to sign the national budget passed by the Chilean National Congress. Balmaceda then dissolved Congress. The dissolution split both the Chilean Army and Navy, with some forces remaining loyal to Congress and others to the President. An armed conflict ensued after a mutiny by the navy, which at that time was docked at Valparaíso.

Supporters of those forces loyal to Congress, including members of the dissolved parliament and their backers among multinational nitrate interests, bought weaponry from Europe and the United States. Better equipped than the forces loyal to the President, they rapidly captured Chile's northern provinces, which had recently been conquered from Bolivia and Peru during the War of the Pacific.

Since the Congressionalists controlled all of the current ships in the Chilean Navy, the Balmacedists commandeered vessels that were nearing completion in England and France, including the torpedo boats Almirante Condell and Almirante Lynch. They were built by Laird Brothers, the same firm that built the Confederate raider Alabama thirty years before. Both Almirante Lynch and Almirante Condell carried an armament of five Whitehead torpedoes, two 14 lb (6.4 kg) guns in echelon on the forecastle and one on the poop, four 3 lb (1.4 kg) guns and two machine guns. Their maximum speed was around 21 kn (39 km/h).

The two ships arrived at Valparaíso on 21 March. Both ships docked at Quintero Bay on 18 April. While at Quintero, their commanding officers, Commander Carlos E. Moraga of Almirante Condell and Commander Juan Fuentes of Almirante Lynch, were informed of the possibility that Blanco Encalada, a Congressionalist frigate, was going to be in Caldera Bay in five days. The two commanders consulted with one another and sent their proposal to attack Blanco Encalada to the Balmacedist government, which was approved.

Blanco Encalada arrived at Caldera Bay on 22 April, under the command of Captain Goñi, escorting several transports. The troops on these ships landed and captured the surrounding railroad and town of Copiapó. At about 01:20, Goñi returned to Blanco Encalada. Although it was known that Balmacedist torpedo boats were nearby, the Congressionalists believed that they would not attack the transports. Because of this, torpedo nets were left onshore, and watertight bulkheads which would have isolated a hull breach were left open.

== Battle ==
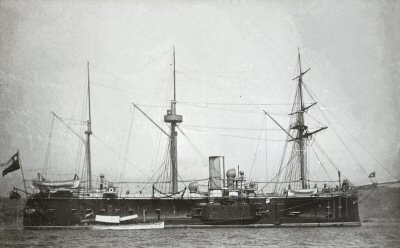
Blanco Encalada in 1879

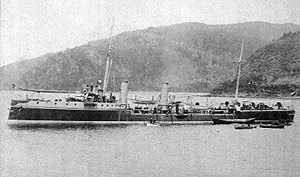
Patricio Lynch torpedo gunboat

At 04:00 on 23 April, Almirante Condell set out toward Caldera Bay about 450 mi (720 km) away, with Almirante Lynch 20 yd (18 m) behind her. The armed steamer Imperial traveled with the torpedo boats, taking up a position to the left of both boats. It was to wait some distance off Caldera, in order to escort the ships back home when the attack ended. Both torpedo boats entered Caldera at roughly 3:30. When they were 500 yd (460 m) from Blanco Encalada, both boats came under fire by rapid-fire guns on board the frigate, which only had seven men stationed as guards. About 100 yd (91 m) from Blanco Encalada, Almirante Condell fired her bow torpedo at the Congressional frigate. It missed and landed on the shore, unexploded. Moraga then turned the torpedo boat into the direct fire of the frigate and fired both his starboard torpedoes. The front torpedo hit, but failed to explode, and the rear torpedo passed clear under the frigate.

As all of Blanco Encalada's guns were occupied by Almirante Condell, the crew did not notice Almirante Lynch approaching from the opposite direction of Almirante Condell. From 50 yd (46 m) out, Almirante Lynch fired her bow torpedo, which missed, and then fired her forward starboard torpedo after executing a turning maneuver like Almirante Condell had done. The second torpedo struck Blanco Encalada, creating a hole roughly 7 by 15 ft (2.1 by 4.6 m). The ship sank within minutes, taking 182 men with it. Several of the men who escaped, including Captain Goñi, did so by clinging to animals in Blanco Encalada's cargo hold, including a llama and a cow.

As she was sinking, the torpedo boats fired their 3-pounder Hotchkiss guns at the survivors, killing about forty. The torpedo boats also fired at the transport Biobio, which had been trying to rescue the surviving crew. Including Captain Goñi, 106 men survived out of the 288 aboard.The entire engagement lasted nine minutes, and Blanco Encalada sank two minutes after the torpedo hit. As Almirante Lynch and Almirante Condell left the harbor, they spotted the transport Aconcagua, which they attacked with their 14-pounder guns (after ruling out their Gatling guns due to their potential for overkill). Aconcagua surrendered after an hour and a half battle, but the torpedo ships were unable to seize her due to an approaching ship which they thought was the Chilean cruiser Esmeralda. It turned out to be the neutral HMS Warspite. Almirante Lynch was slightly damaged in the battle, suffering hits to her steam-pipe and flooding in her aft compartment, but besides that, the two torpedo boats were undamaged.

== Aftermath and impact on torpedo use ==
The sinking of Blanco Encalada led to an attack by Almirante Condell and Almirante Lynch on her sister ship, Almirante Cochrane, at that time moored at Iquique. Almirante Cochrane retreated before any torpedoes were fired. On 28 August, the Balmacedist army was defeated at the Battle of La Placilla. Their army lost about 1,000 men, and three days later Congressional forces marched into Santiago, effectively ending the Chilean Civil War. Blanco Encalada underwent some re-floating attempts after the war, which were ultimately unsuccessful, and she was left in Caldera Bay until being demolished in 1954 when a new bridge was under construction. The Chilean government launched another Blanco Encalada, a cruiser, in 1894.

The battle had a wider impact on naval weapons development because Blanco Encalada was the first ironclad warship sunk by a self-propelled torpedo. News of the attack spread and as a result of the action, navies of several major powers realized the potential of torpedoes as a cheap counter to expensive pre-dreadnoughts, which led to the acceleration of submarine and torpedo boat production, the addition of torpedo nets to ships for use when they were moored in port, and the addition of torpedo tubes to surface ships. During the Russo-Japanese War, over 300 self-propelled torpedoes were fired, in one instance finishing off the already seriously damaged Russian flagship Knyaz Suvorov at the Battle of Tsushima. Torpedo boats also sank two armored cruisers and two destroyers during the course of the war. By the start of World War I, torpedo boats and submarines were in widespread use in many navies.
