= Torpedo boat =

Small, fast naval ship designed to carry torpedoes into battle

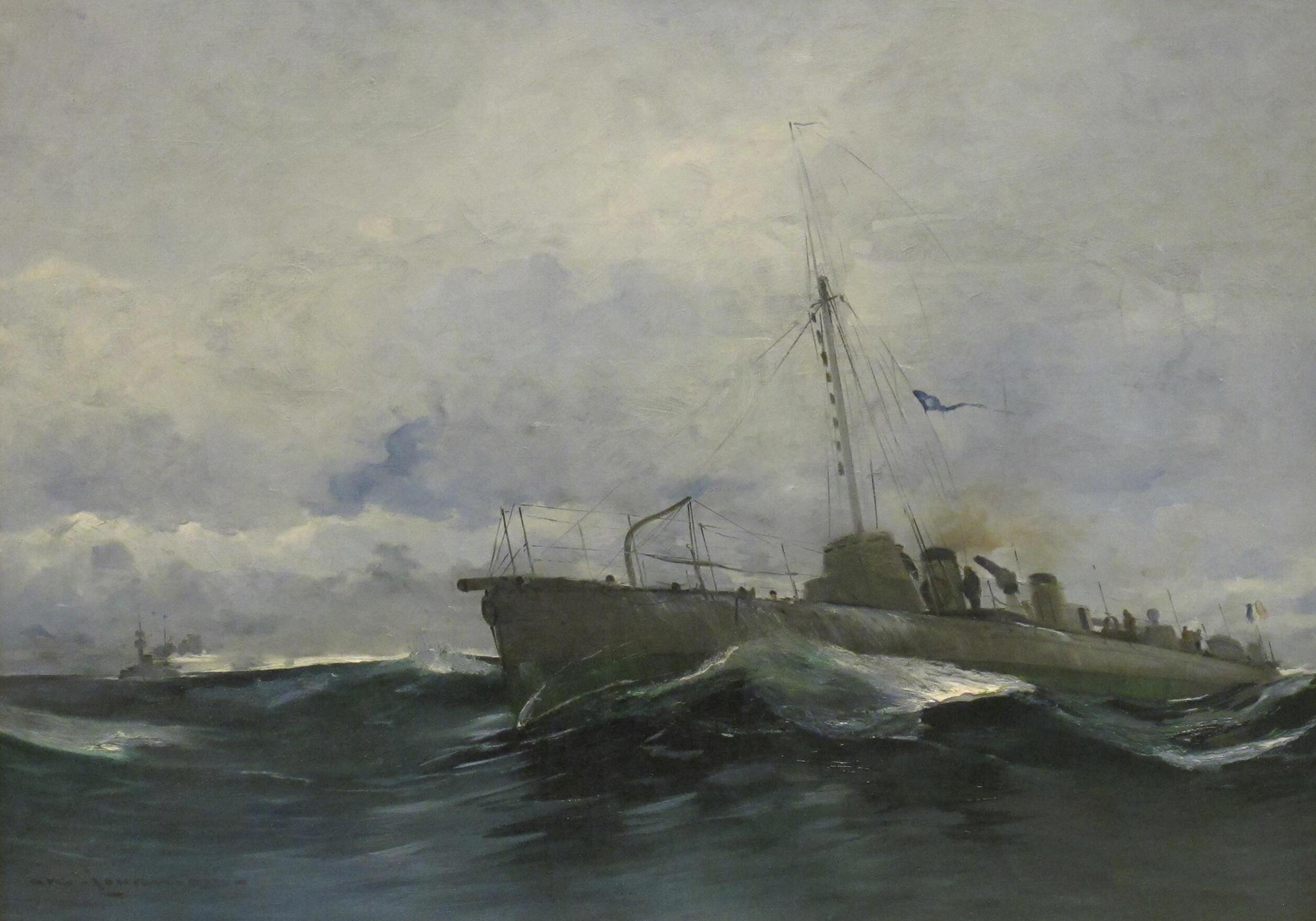
Painting of a French Navy torpedo boat

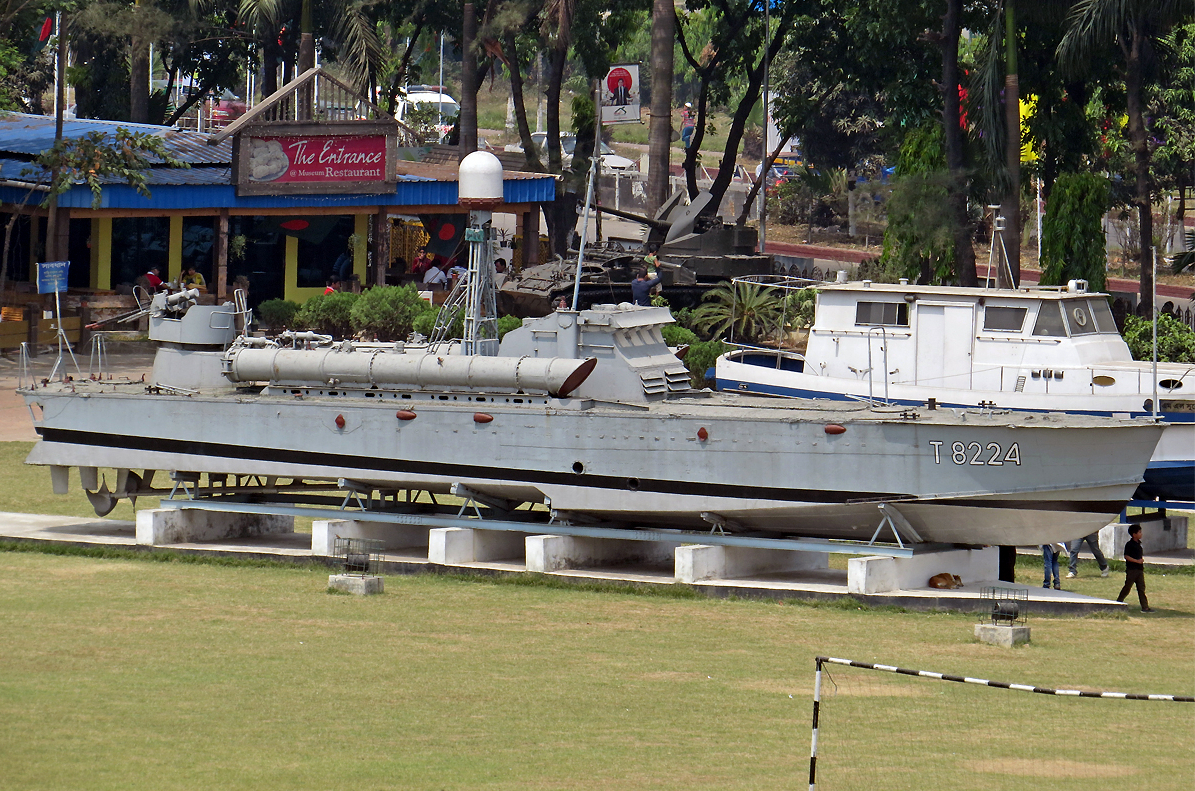
A decommissioned P 4-class torpedo boat of the Bangladesh Navy preserved at the Bangladesh Military Museum

A torpedo boat is a relatively small and fast naval ship designed to carry torpedoes into battle. The first designs were steam-powered craft dedicated to ramming enemy ships with explosive spar torpedoes. Later evolutions launched variants of self-propelled Whitehead torpedoes.

Torpedo boats were (and still are) chiefly small inshore crafts created to counter the threat of battleships and other slow and heavily armed warships by using speed, agility, and powerful torpedoes. They presented an attractive alternative for smaller nations to the overwhelming cost and industrial strains involved in building a like number of capital ships to counter an enemy fleet. A swarm of expendable torpedo boats attacking en masse could overwhelm a larger ship's ability to fight them off using its large but cumbersome guns. A fleet of torpedo boats could pose a dire threat to an adversary's capital ships, albeit only in the coastal areas to which their small size and limited fuel load restricted them.

The introduction of fast torpedo boats in the late 19th century was a serious concern to the era's naval strategists, introducing the concept of tactical asymmetric warfare. In response, navies operating large ships introduced firstly batteries of small-calibre quick-firing guns on board large warships for 'anti-torpedo' defence, before developing small but seaworthy ships, mounting light quick-firing guns, to accompany the fleet and counter torpedo boats. These small ships, which came to be called "torpedo boat destroyers", later simplified to "destroyers", initially were largely defensive, primarily meeting the torpedo boat threat with their own guns outside of the range at which battleships would be vulnerable. In time they became larger and took on more roles, including making their own torpedo attacks on valuable enemy ships as well as defending against submarines and aircraft. Later yet they were armed with guided missiles and eventually became the predominant type of surface warship in the modern era.

Today, the old concept of a very small, fast, and cheap surface combatant with powerful offensive weapons is taken up by the "fast attack craft".

== Spar torpedo boats ==
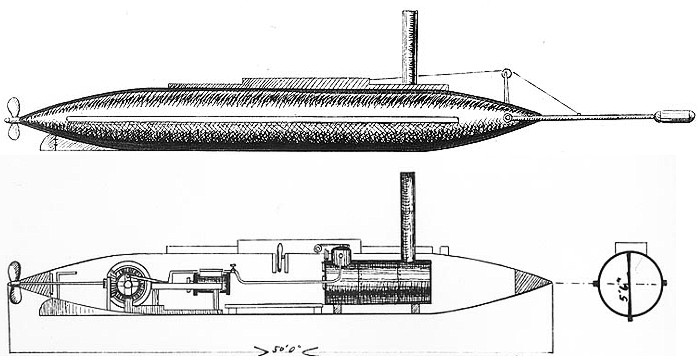
Confederate torpedo boat CSS David

The American Civil War saw a number of innovations in naval warfare, including an early type of torpedo boat, armed with spar torpedoes. In 1861, President Abraham Lincoln instituted a naval blockade of Southern ports, which crippled the South's efforts to obtain war materiel from abroad. The South also lacked the means to construct a naval fleet capable of taking on the Union Navy on even terms. One strategy to counter the blockade saw the development of torpedo boats, small fast boats designed to attack the larger capital ships of the blockading fleet as a form of asymmetrical warfare.

The David class of torpedo boats were steam powered with a partially enclosed hull. They were not true submarines but were semi-submersible; when ballasted, only the smokestack and few inches of the hull were above the water line. CSS Midge was a David-class torpedo boat. CSS Squib and CSS Scorpion represented another class of torpedo boats that were also low built but had open decks and lacked the ballasting tanks found on the Davids.

The Confederate torpedo boats were armed with spar torpedoes. This was a charge of powder in a waterproof case, mounted to the bow of the torpedo boat below the water line on a long spar. The torpedo boat attacked by ramming her intended target, which stuck the torpedo to the target ship by means of a barb on the front of the torpedo. The torpedo boat would back away to a safe distance and detonate the torpedo, usually by means of a long cord attached to a trigger.

In general, the Confederate torpedo boats were not very successful. Their low sides made them susceptible to swamping in high seas, and even to having their boiler fires extinguished by spray from their own torpedo explosions. Torpedo misfires (too early) and duds were common. In 1864, Union Navy Lieutenant William B. Cushing fitted a steam launch with a spar torpedo to attack the Confederate ironclad Albemarle. Also the same year the Union launched USS Spuyten Duyvil, a purpose-built craft with a number of technical innovations including variable ballast for attack operations and an extensible and reloadable torpedo placement spar.

== Self-propelled torpedo ==
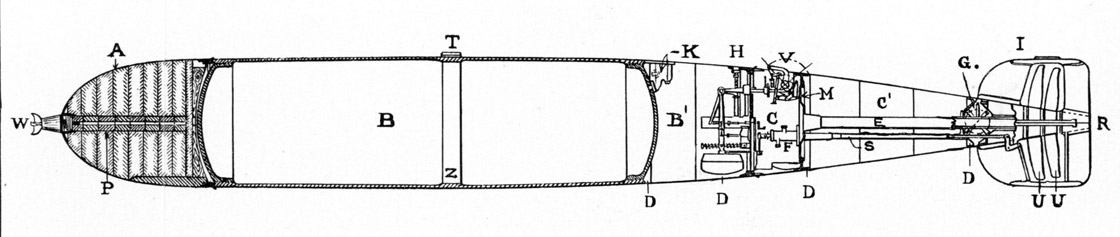
Whitehead torpedo's general profile: A. war-head B. air-flask. B'. immersion-chamber CC'. after-body C. engine-room DDDD. drain-holes E. shaft-tube F. steering-engine G. bevel-gear box H. depth-index I. tail K. charging and stop-valves L. locking-gear M. engine bed-plate P. primer-case R. rudder S. steering-rod tube T. guide-stud UU. propellers V. valve-group W. war-nose Z. strengthening-band

A prototype self-propelled torpedo was created by a commission placed by Giovanni Luppis, an Austrian naval officer from Rijeka, then a port city of the Austro-Hungarian Empire, and Robert Whitehead, an English engineer who was the manager of a town factory. In 1864, Luppis presented Whitehead with the plans of the Salvacoste ("coastsaver"), a floating weapon driven by ropes from the land that had been dismissed by the naval authorities due to the impractical steering and propulsion mechanisms.

Whitehead was unable to improve the machine substantially, since the clockwork motor, attached ropes, and surface attack mode all contributed to a slow and cumbersome weapon. However, he kept considering the problem after the contract had finished, and eventually developed a tubular device, designed to run underwater on its own, and powered by compressed air. The result was a submarine weapon, the Minenschiff ("mine ship"), the first modern self-propelled torpedo, officially presented to the Austrian Imperial Naval commission on December 21, 1866.

The first trials were not successful as the weapon was unable to maintain a course on a steady depth. After much work, Whitehead introduced his "secret" in 1868 which overcame this. It was a mechanism consisting of a hydrostatic valve and pendulum that caused the torpedo's hydroplanes to be adjusted so as to maintain a preset depth.

== First torpedo boats ==
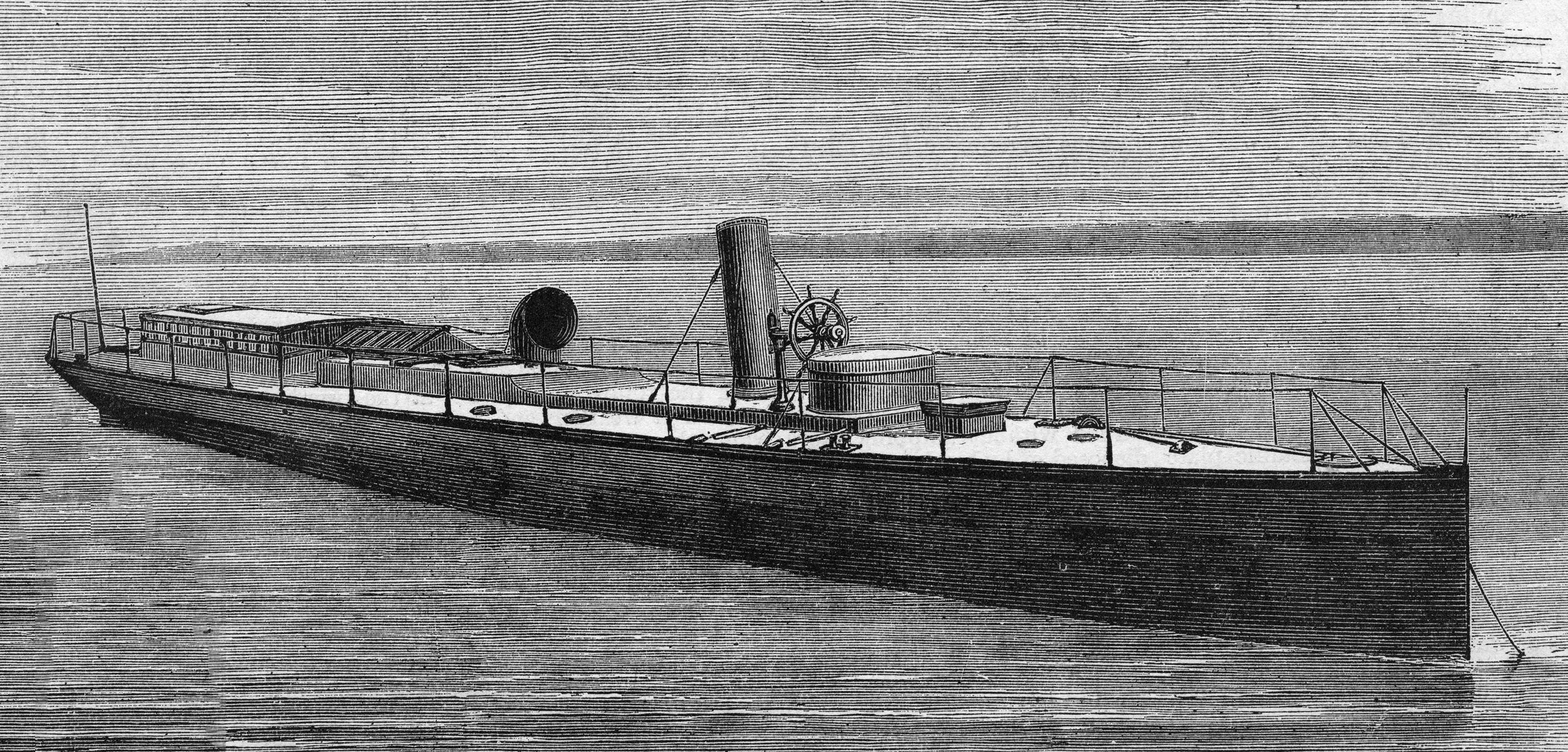
HMS Lightning, the first modern torpedo boat, built in 1876

During the mid-19th century, the ships of the line were superseded by large steam powered ships with heavy gun armament and heavy armour, called ironclads. Ultimately this line of development led to the dreadnought class of all-big-gun battleship, starting with HMS Dreadnought.

At the same time, the weight of armour slowed the battleships, and the huge guns needed to penetrate enemy armour fired at very slow rates. This allowed for the possibility of a small and fast ship that could attack the battleships, at a much lower cost. The introduction of the torpedo provided a weapon that could cripple, or even sink, any battleship.

The first warship of any kind to carry self-propelled torpedoes was HMS Vesuvius of 1873. The first seagoing vessel designed to fire the self-propelled Whitehead torpedo was HMS Lightning. The boat was built by John Thornycroft at Church Wharf in Chiswick for the Royal Navy. It entered service in 1876 and was armed with self-propelled Whitehead torpedoes.

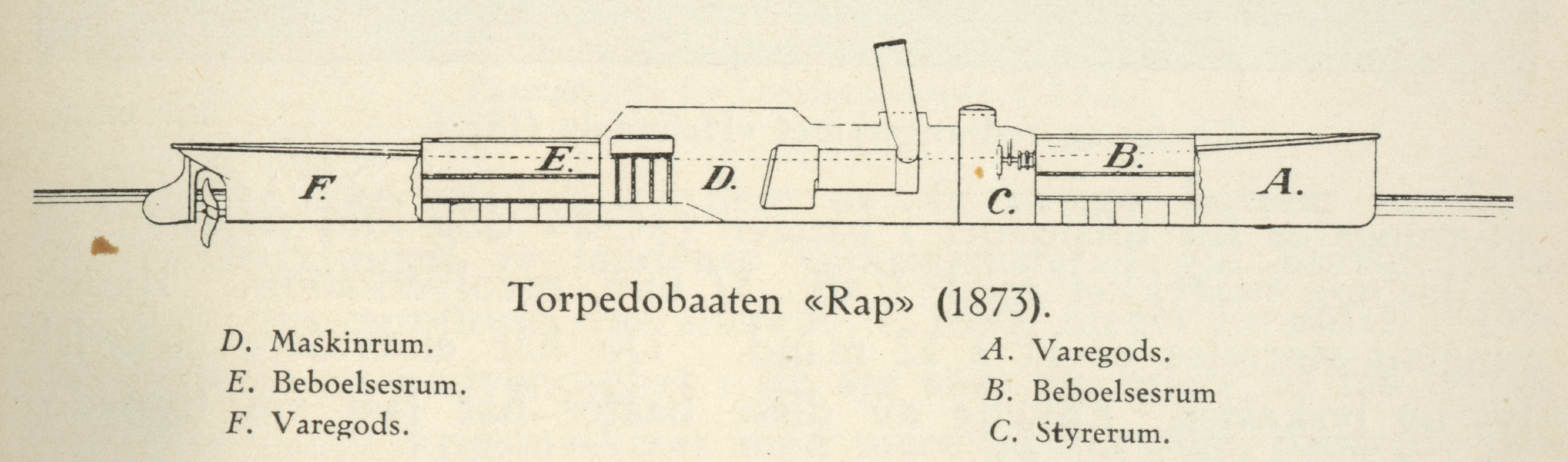
Another early torpedo boat, HNoMS Rap

As originally built, Lightning had two drop collars to launch torpedoes; these were replaced in 1879 by a single torpedo tube in the bow. She also carried two reload torpedoes amidships. She was later renamed Torpedo Boat No. 1. The French Navy followed suit in 1878 with Torpilleur No 1, launched in 1878 though she had been ordered in 1875.

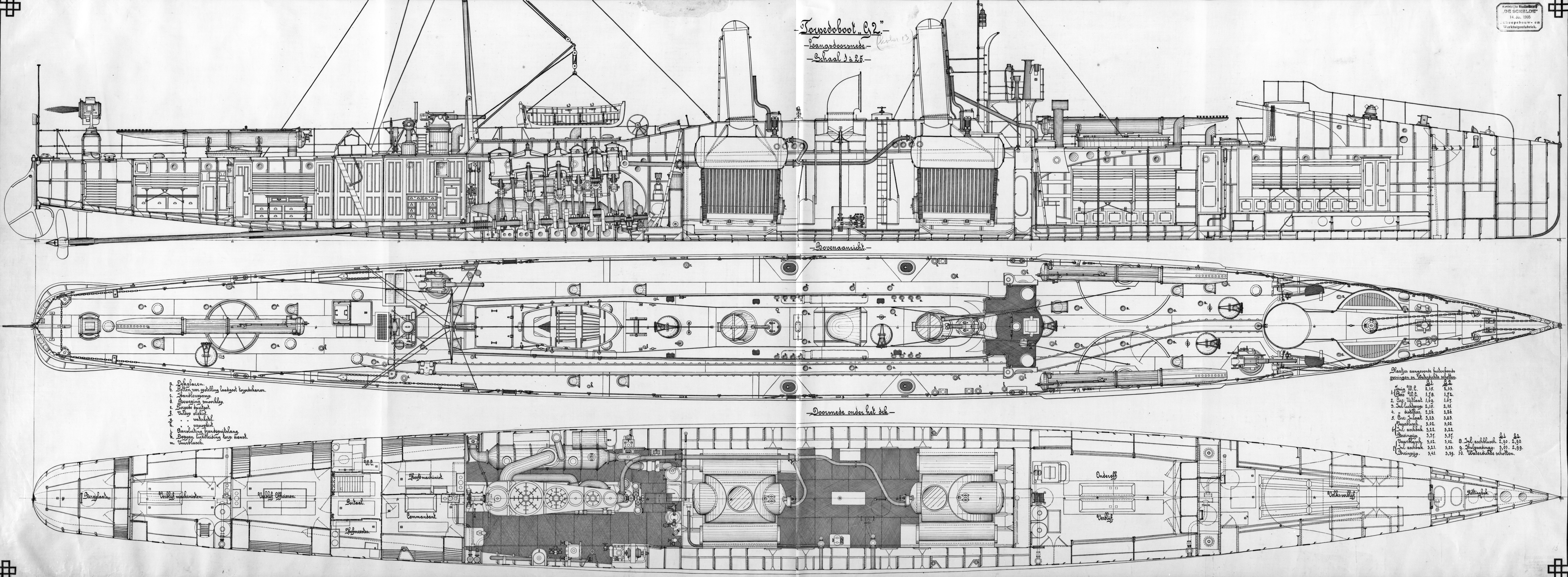
Plan of G2 torpedo boat of the Royal Netherlands Navy launched in 1903. Displacement 140 tons, armed with 3 450 mm torpedoes and 2 75 mm guns

Another early such ship was the Norwegian warship HNoMS Rap, ordered from Thornycroft shipbuilding company, England, in either 1872 or 1873, and built at Thornycroft's shipyard at Church Wharf in Chiswick on the River Thames. Managing a speed of 14.5 knots (27 km/h), she was one of the fastest boats afloat when completed. The Norwegians initially planned to arm her with a spar torpedo, but this may never have been fitted. Rap was outfitted with launch racks for the new self-propelled Whitehead torpedoes in 1879.

== Use in combat ==
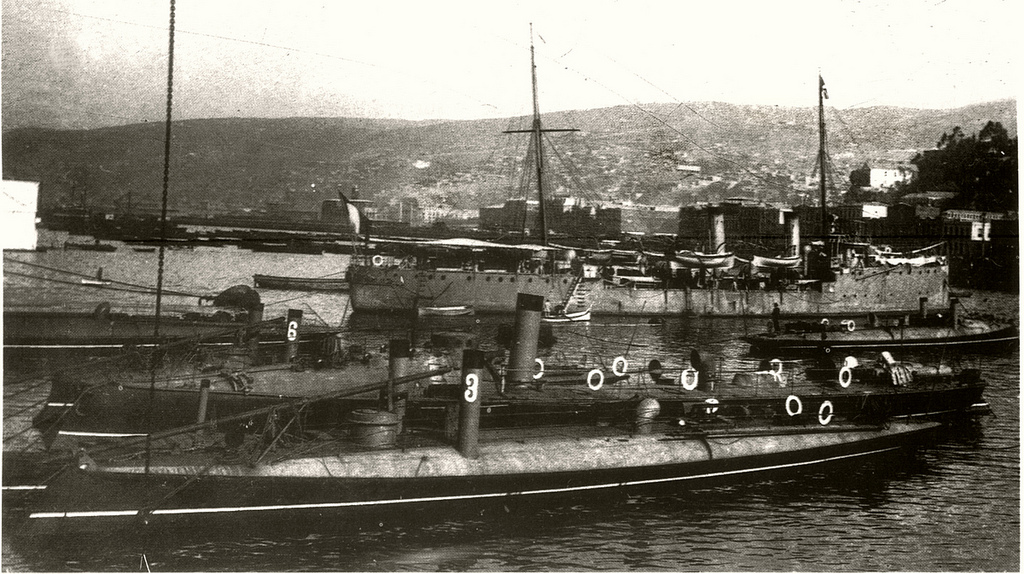
Chilean torpedo boats in Valparaíso, used during War of the Pacific

In the late 19th century, many navies started to build torpedo boats 30 to 50 metres (98 to 164 ft) in length, armed with up to three torpedo launchers and small guns. They were powered by steam engines and had a maximum speed of 20 to 30 knots (37 to 56 km/h). They were relatively inexpensive and could be purchased in quantity, allowing mass attacks on fleets of larger ships. The loss of even a squadron of torpedo boats to enemy fire would be more than outweighed by the sinking of a capital ship.

The Russo-Japanese War of 1904–1905 was the first great naval war of the 20th century. It was the first practical testing of the new steel battleships, cruisers, destroyers, submarines, and torpedo boats. During the war the Imperial Russian Navy in addition to their other warships, deployed 86 torpedo boats and launched 27 torpedoes (from all warships) in three major campaigns, scoring 5 hits.

The Imperial Japanese Navy (IJN), like the Russians, often combined their torpedo boats (the smaller of which possessed only hull numbers, although the larger 1st class boats were named) with their torpedo boat destroyers (TBDs) (often simply referring to them as destroyers) and launched over 270 torpedoes (counting the opening engagement at Port Arthur naval base on 8 February 1904) during the war. The IJN deployed approximately 21 TBs during the conflict, and on 27 May 1905 the Japanese torpedo boat destroyers and TBs launched 16 torpedoes at the battleship Knyaz Suvorov, Admiral Zinovy Rozhestvensky's flagship at the battle of Tsushima. Admiral Tōgō Heihachirō, the IJN commander, had ordered his torpedo boats to finish off the enemy flagship, already gunned into a wreck, as he prepared to pursue the remnants of the Russian battle fleet.

Of the 16 torpedoes launched by the TBDs and TBs at the Russian battleship, only four hit their mark, two of those hits were from torpedo boats #72 and #75. By evening, the battleship rolled over and sank to the bottom of the Tsushima Straits. By war's end, torpedoes launched from warships had sunk one battleship, two armored cruisers, and two destroyers. The remaining over 80 warships would be sunk by guns, mines, scuttling, or shipwreck.

== Torpedo boat destroyers ==
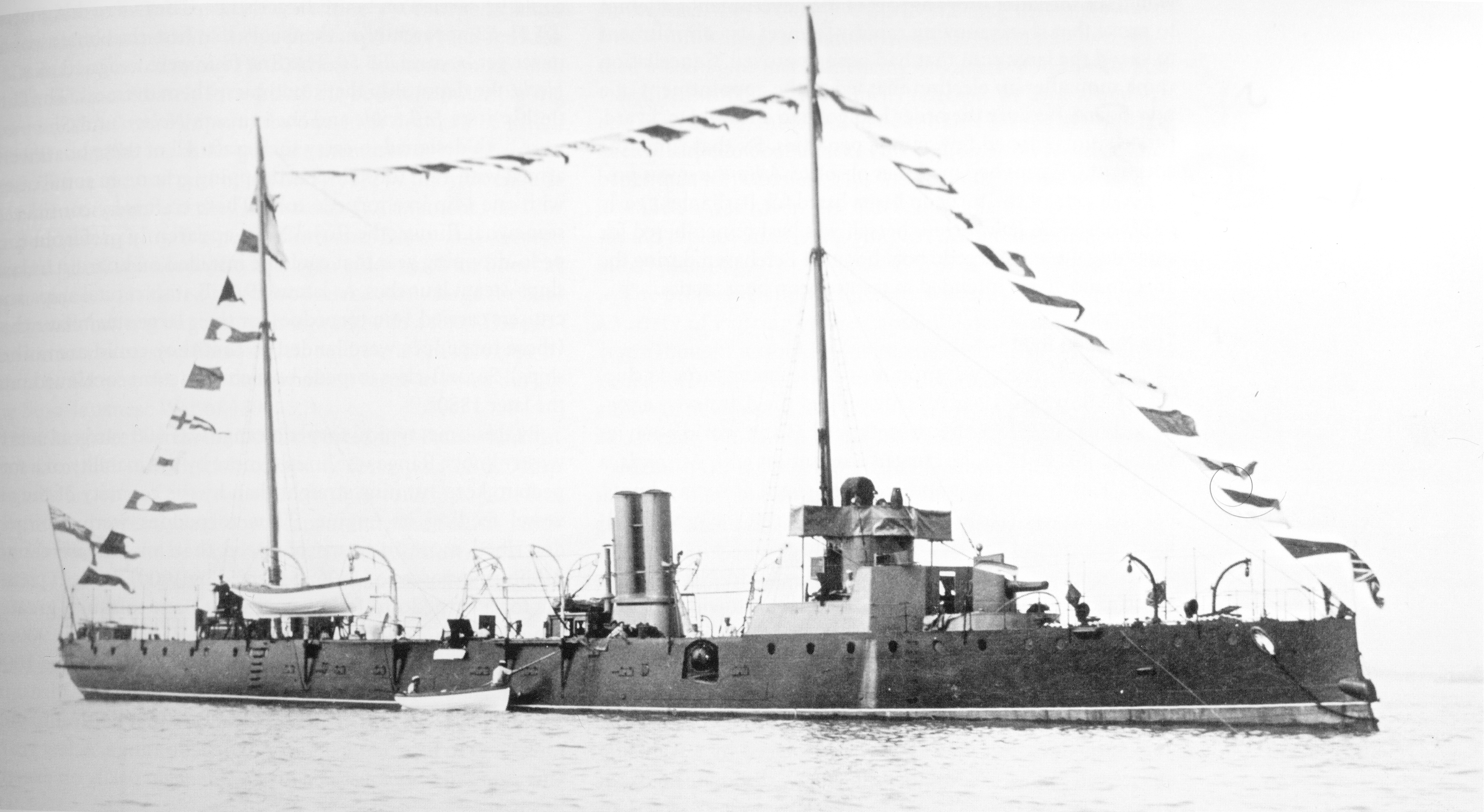
HMS Spider, an early model of torpedo gunboat

The introduction of the torpedo boat resulted in a flurry of activity in navies around the world, as smaller, quicker-firing guns were added to existing ships to ward off the new threat. In the mid-1880s there were developed torpedo gunboats, the first vessel designed for the explicit purpose of hunting and destroying torpedo boats. Essentially very small cruisers, torpedo gunboats were equipped with torpedo tubes and an adequate gun armament, intended for hunting down smaller enemy boats.

The first example of this was HMS Rattlesnake, designed by Nathaniel Barnaby in 1885. The gunboat was armed with torpedoes and designed for hunting and destroying smaller torpedo boats. She was armed with a single 4-inch/25-pounder breech-loading gun, six 3-pounder QF guns and four 14-inch (360 mm) torpedo tubes, arranged with two fixed tubes at the bow and a set of torpedo dropping carriages on either side. Four torpedo reloads were carried.

A number of torpedo gunboat classes followed, including the Grasshopper class, the Sharpshooter class, the Alarm class and the Dryad class – all built for the Royal Navy during the 1880s and the 1890s. In 1891, a Chilean Almirante Lynch class torpedo gunboat managed to sink the ironclad Blanco Encalada with a torpedo at the battle of Caldera Bay during the Chilean Civil War of 1891. This marked a milestone in naval history, as it was the first time an ironclad warship had been sunk by a self-propelled torpedo.

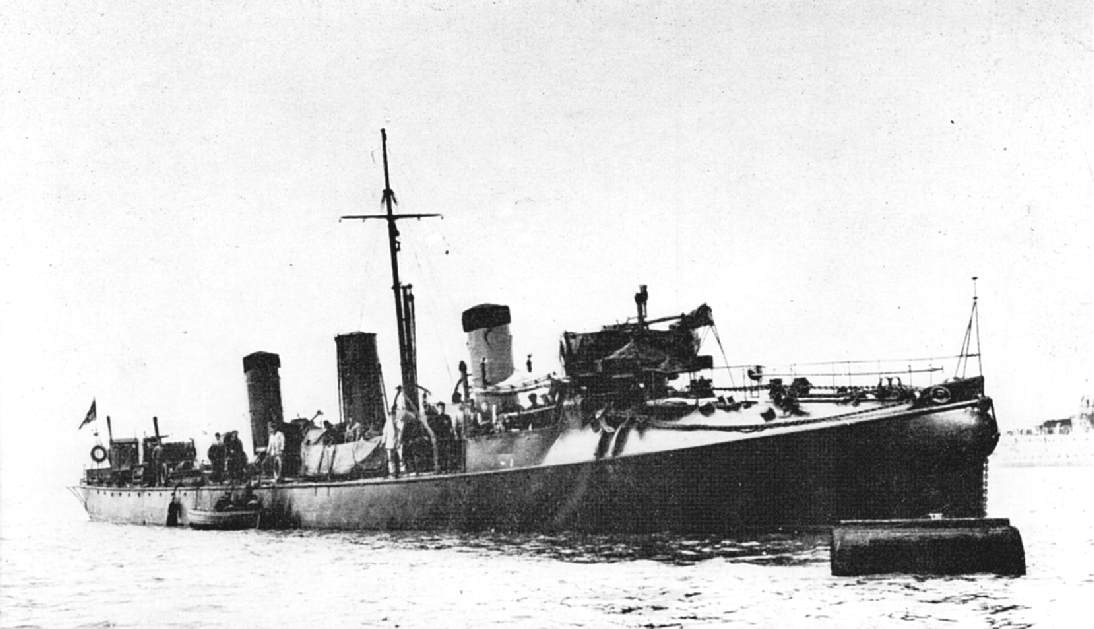
HMS Havock the first modern destroyer, commissioned in 1894

In the late 1890s, torpedo boats had been made obsolete by their more successful contemporaries, the torpedo boat destroyers, which were much faster. The first ships to bear the formal designation "torpedo boat destroyer" (TBD) were the Daring class of two ships and Havock class of two ships of the Royal Navy, ordered from Yarrows in 1892 by Rear Admiral Jackie Fisher. These were basically enlarged torpedo boats, with speed equal to or surpassing the torpedo boats, but were armed with heavier guns that could attack them before they were able to close on the main fleet.

HMS Daring and HMS Decoy were both built by Thornycroft. They were armed with one 12-pounder gun and three 6-pounder guns, with one fixed 18-in torpedo tube in the bow plus two more torpedo tubes on a revolving mount behind the two funnels. Later the bow torpedo tube was removed and two more 6-pounder guns added instead. They produced 4,200 hp (3,100 kW) from a pair of Thornycroft water-tube boilers, giving them a top speed of 27 knots, giving the range and speed to travel effectively with a battle fleet.

After the Russo-Japanese War, these ships became known simply as destroyers. Destroyers became so much more useful, having better seaworthiness and greater capabilities than torpedo boats, that they eventually replaced most torpedo boats. However, the London Naval Treaty after World War I limited tonnage of warships, but placed no limits on ships of under 600 tons. The French, Italian, Japanese and German Navies developed torpedo boats around that displacement, 70 to 100 m long, armed with two or three guns of around 100 mm (4 in) and torpedo launchers. For example, the Royal Norwegian Navy Sleipner-class destroyers were in fact of a torpedo boat size, while the Italian Spica-class torpedo boats were closer in size to a destroyer escort. After World War II they were eventually subsumed into the revived corvette classification.

The Kriegsmarine torpedo boats were classified Torpedoboot with "T"-prefixed hull numbers. The classes designed in the mid-1930s, such as the Torpedo boat type 35, had few guns, relying almost entirely upon their torpedoes. This was found to be inadequate in combat, and the result was a "fleet torpedo boat" class (Flottentorpedoboot), which were significantly larger, up to 1,700 tons, comparable to small destroyers. This class of German boats could be highly effective -in the 1943 action known as the Battle of Sept-Îles in which the British cruiser HMS Charybdis (part of a force intercepting blockade runners) was sunk off Brittany by a torpedo salvo launched by the Elbing-class torpedo boats T23 and T27.

== Motor torpedo craft ==
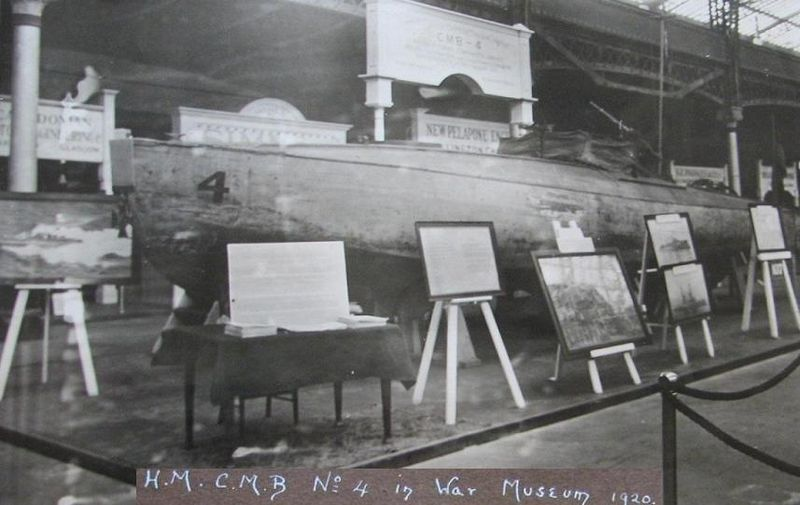
Captained by Augustus Agar, CMB No. 4 sank a Russian cruiser in Kronstadt harbour.

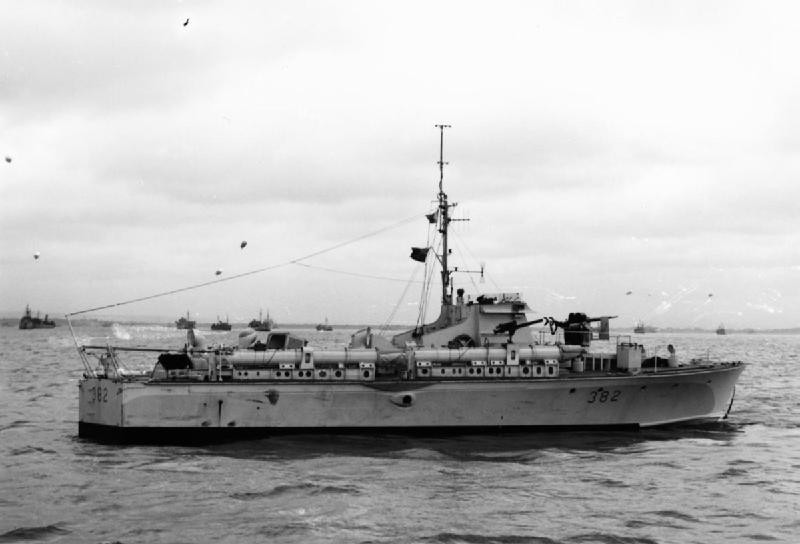
A British World War II Vosper 73-ft. motor torpedo boat

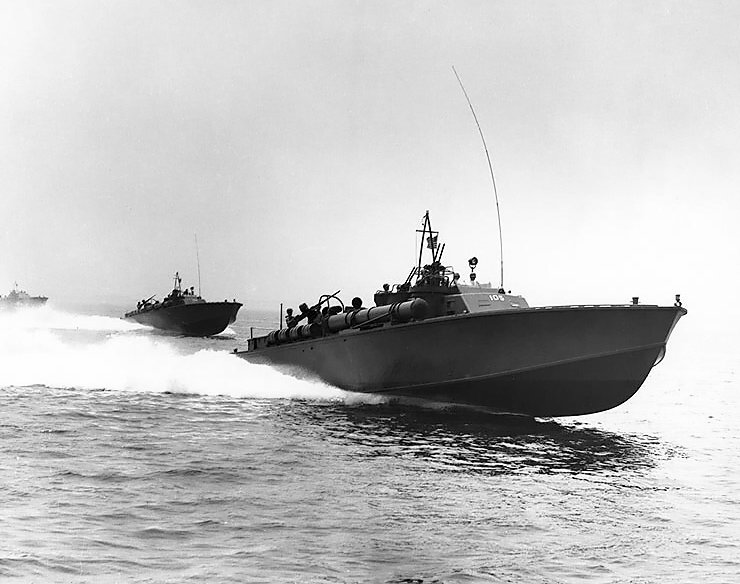
PT-105, an 80-ft. Elco U.S. Navy PT boat in World War II

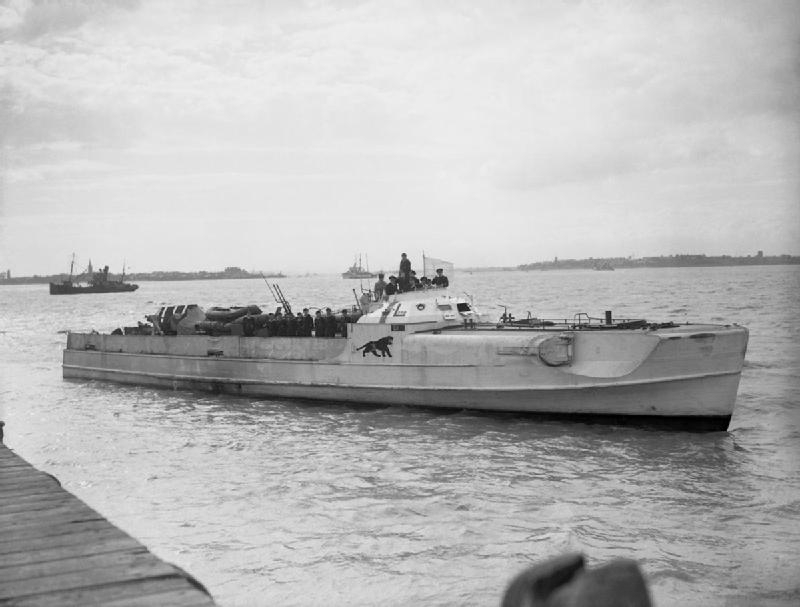
The 114-ft. diesel-powered German E-boats were considerably larger than most British and American motor torpedo boats.

Before World War I steam torpedo boats which were larger and more heavily armed than hitherto were being used. The new internal combustion engine generated much more power for a given weight and size than steam engines, and allowed the development of a new class of small and fast boats. These powerful engines could make use of planing hull designs and were capable of the much higher speed of 30 to 50 knots (56 to 93 km/h) under appropriate sea conditions than displacement hulls. The boat could carry two to four torpedoes fired from simple fixed launchers and several machine guns.

During the First World War, three junior officers of the Harwich Force suggested that small motor boats carrying a torpedo might be capable of travelling over the protective minefields and attacking ships of the Imperial German Navy at anchor in their bases. In 1915, the Admiralty produced a Staff Requirement requesting designs for a Coastal Motor Boat for service in the North Sea. These boats were expected to have a high speed, making use of the lightweight and powerful petrol engines then available. The speed of the boat when fully loaded was to be at least 30 knots (56 km/h) and sufficient fuel was to be carried to give a considerable radius of action.

They were to be armed in a variety of ways, with torpedoes, depth charges or for laying anti-ship mines. Secondary armament would have been provided by light machine guns, such as the Lewis gun. The CMBs were designed by Thornycroft, who had experience in small fast boats. Engines were not proper maritime internal combustion engines (as these were in short supply) but adapted aircraft engines from firms such as Sunbeam and Napier. A total of 39 such vessels were built.

In 1917 Thornycroft produced an enlarged 60-foot (18 m) overall version. This allowed a heavier payload, and now two torpedoes could be carried. A mixed warload of a single torpedo and four depth charges could also be carried, the depth charges released from individual cradles over the sides, rather than a stern ramp. Speeds from 35–41 knots (40–47 mph; 65–76 km/h) were possible, depending on the various petrol engines fitted. At least two unexplained losses due to fires in port are thought to have been caused by a build-up of petrol vapour igniting.

Admiralty Chart of the Channel Dash, when German destroyers defended a German flotilla against Royal Navy Motor torpedo craft

Italian torpedo boats sank the Austrian-Hungarian SMS Wien in 1917, and SMS Szent István in 1918. During the civil war in Russia, British torpedo boats made raids on Kronstadt harbour damaging two battleships and sinking a cruiser.

Such vessels remained useful through World War II. The Royal Navy's Motor Torpedo Boats (MTBs), Kriegsmarine 'S-Boote' (Schnellboot or "fast-boat": the British termed them E-boats), (Italian) M.A.S. and M.S., Soviet Navy G-5 and U.S. PT boats (standing for Patrol Torpedo) were all of this type.

A classic fast torpedo boat action was the Channel Dash in February 1942 when German E-boats and destroyers defended the flotilla of Scharnhorst, Gneisenau, Prinz Eugen and several smaller ships as they passed through the Channel.

By World War II torpedo boats were seriously hampered by higher fleet speeds; although they still had a speed advantage, they could only catch the larger ships by running at very high speeds over very short distances, as demonstrated in the Channel Dash. An even greater threat was the widespread arrival of patrol aircraft, which could hunt down torpedo boats long before they could engage their targets.

During World War II United States naval forces employed fast wooden PT boats in the South Pacific in a number of roles in addition to the originally envisioned one of torpedo attack. PT boats performed search and rescue, reconnaissance, ferry and courier work as well as attack and smoke screening duties. They took part in fleet actions and they worked in smaller groups and singly to harry enemy supply lines. Late in the Pacific War when large targets became scarce, many PT boats replaced two or all four of their torpedo tubes with additional guns for engaging enemy coastal supply boats and barges, isolating enemy-held islands from supply, reinforcement or evacuation.

The most significant military ship sunk by a torpedo boat during World War II was the cruiser HMS Manchester which was attacked by two Italian torpedo boats (M.S. 16 and M.S. 22) during Operation Pedestal on 13 August 1942. It seems that the torpedo that mortally struck Manchester was launched by M.S. 22 (commanded by Tenente di vascello Franco Mezzadra) from a distance of about 600 meters.

== Fast attack craft today ==
Boats similar to torpedo boats are still in use, but are armed with long-range anti-ship missiles that can be used at ranges between 30 and 70 km. This reduces the need for high-speed chases and gives them much more room to operate in while approaching their targets.

Aircraft are a major threat, making the use of boats against any fleet with air cover very risky. The low height of the radar mast makes it difficult to acquire and lock onto a target while maintaining a safe distance. As a result, fast attack craft are being replaced for use in naval combat by larger corvettes, which are able to carry radar-guided anti-aircraft missiles for self-defense, and helicopters for over-the-horizon targeting.

Although torpedo boats have disappeared from the majority of the world's navies, they remained in use until the late 1990s and early 2000s in a few specialised areas, most notably in the Baltic. The close confines of the Baltic and ground clutter effectively negated the range benefits of early ASMs. Operating close to shore in conjunction with land based air cover and radars, and in the case of the Norwegian navy hidden bases cut into fjord sides, torpedo boats remained a cheap and viable deterrent to amphibious attack. Indeed, this is still the operational model followed by the Chinese Navy with its Type 025-class torpedo boat for the protection of its coastal and estuarial waters.

== See also ==
- Torpedo boat tender
- Torpedo ram
- Missile boat
- Jeune École – naval strategy centered around small attack crafts against capital ships

== Bibliography ==
- Campbell, Thomas R. (2001). Hunters of the Night: Confederate Torpedo Boats in the War Between the States. Burd Street Press.
- Jentschura, Hansgeorg (1977). Warships of the Imperial Japanese Navy, 1869–1945. Annapolis, Maryland: United States Naval Institute. ISBN 0-87021-893-X.
- Lyon, David (1996). The First Destroyers. London, Great Britain: Chatham Publishing. ISBN 1-55750-271-4.
- Olender, Piotr (2010). Russo-Japanese Naval War 1904–1905, Vol. 2, Battle of Tsushima. Sandomierz, Poland: Stratus s.c. ISBN 9788361421023.
- Preston, Antony (1977). Destroyer. London: Bison Books. ISBN 0-600-32955-0.
