= BAE Abdón Calderón =

Museum ship of the Ecuadorian Navy

Coordinates: 2.21543°S 79.88731°W

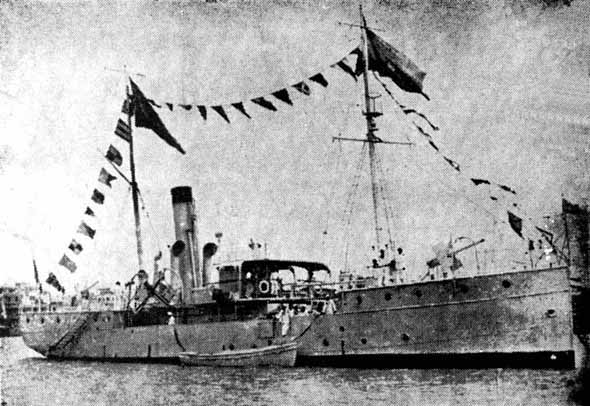

History

Ecuador
- Name: Abdón Calderón
- Builder: David Dunlop & Co, Port Glasgow
- Yard number: 179
- Laid down: 1884
- Launched: 15 November 1884
- Completed: 1885
- Acquired: 12 December 1886
- Decommissioned: 1960
- Status: Museum ship

General characteristics
- Tonnage: 186 GRT
- Displacement: 300 long tons (305 t)
- Length: 40 m (131 ft 3 in)
- Beam: 4.8 m (15 ft 9 in)
- Draught: 2.7 m (8 ft 10 in)
- Propulsion: Reciprocal steam engine, 1 shaft, 150 shp (112 kW)
- Speed: 8 knots (15 km/h; 9.2 mph)
- Range: 500 nmi (930 km)
- Complement: 54
- Armament: 2 × Armstrong 76 mm (3 in) guns; 2 × Armstrong 47 mm (2 in) guns; 2 × Breda 20 mm AA guns

BAE Abdón Calderón is a naval ship of Ecuador, built in 1885 and preserved as a museum ship at Guayaquil.

== Service history ==
The Ecuadorian naval vessel Abdón Calderón was built in 1885 at Port Glasgow, Scotland by David Dunlop & Co as the cargo ship Chaihuin for Chilean shipowners Adam Greulich y Compañia of Valparaíso. In December 1886 she was purchased by the Ecuador Government, becoming the war steamer Cotopaxi, and was armed with four breech-loading Armstrong cannons and two Gatling guns. In 1892 Cotopaxi was redesignated as a cruiser.

In September 1913 in the Concha Revolution following the assassination of President Eloy Alfaro, the people of Esmeraldas revolted against the government of the new president, General Leónidas Plaza and attacked the local army headquarters. Cotopaxi was already anchored nearby and approached the city and fired warning shots from her 76mm cannon. With the assistance of two contingents of her crew which went ashore, the army was relieved. An extended siege followed, but after the end of the revolts in 1916 a period of austerity led to the reduction in the size of the navy, with only the Cotopaxi remaining in service by the mid-1920s. From 1924 she was also used as a training ship. In 1927 Cotopaxi was again redesignated, as a gunboat, and nine years later her name was changed to Abdón Calderón in honour of the revolutionary hero who died from injuries sustained on 24 May 1822 during the Battle of Pichincha.

=== Ecuadorian–Peruvian War ===
At the beginning of the Ecuadorian–Peruvian War in July 1941, the port of Guayaquil was blockaded and Abdón Calderón was hurriedly prepared, though with antiquated armament. On 25 July she encountered the Peruvian Orfey class destroyer Almirante Villar in the Jambeli channel. After spotting Abdon Calderón, the Ecuadorian ship that was in transit to Guayaquil, as soon as it recognized the Peruvian ship, turned 180º with respect to its course, fleeing towards Puerto Bolívar while firing shots. Almirante Villar did the same, maneuvering in circles, avoiding getting too close to the coast (due to the low seabed there). After 21 minutes of exchange of shots by both sides, the incident ended. On her side, the destroyer Almirante Villar continued its operations uninterruptedly in the North Theater of Operations until October 1 of that year, when she returned to the port of Callao. On the other hand, the Abdón Calderón suffered serious damage to its caldera, forcing it to flee and hiding behind the dense vegetation in the Jambelí Canal and the Santa Rosa estuary.

According to the official Ecuadorian military history, the BAP Almirante Villar of Peru received significant damage from the BAE Calderón, but there is no evidence to support such a version. Neither documentary nor materially has it been possible to demonstrate with evidence that the Peruvian destroyer received impacts and was damaged according to the report of Ecuadorian Commander Morán, in charge of "Abdón Calderón".

Abdón Calderón was later transferred to the Coast Guard and remained in active service until 1957, when she was moored in port.

== Museum ship ==
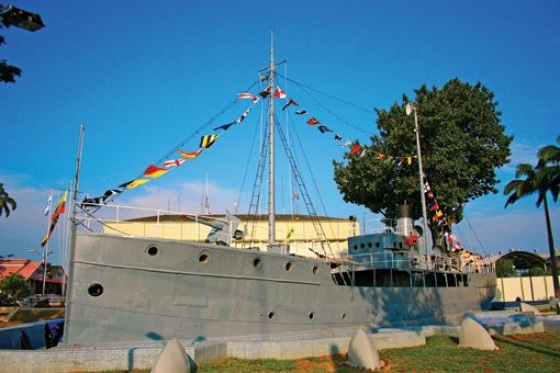
Abdón Calderón at the Parque de la Armada

In 1960 Abdón Calderón was decommissioned for conversion to a static memorial museum and placed ashore in the Parque de la Armada (Navy Park) at Guayaquil. The museum was inaugurated in 1972.

== See also ==
- Ecuadorian torpedo gunboat Libertador Bolívar
