= John I. Thornycroft & Company =

Shipbuilding company in the United Kingdom

Coordinates: 50°53′43.44″N 1°22′56.76″W

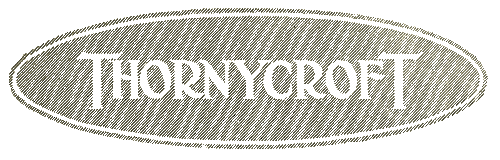
- Type: Private company
- Industry: Shipbuilding
- Founded: 1866
- Defunct: 1966
- Fate: Merged with Vosper & Company
- Successor: Babcock International; VT GroupVT's Shipbuilding Operations merged with those of BAE Systems
- Headquarters: Woolston, Southampton, UK

John I. Thornycroft & Company Limited, usually known simply as Thornycroft, was a British shipbuilding firm founded by John Isaac Thornycroft in Chiswick in 1866. It moved to Woolston, Southampton, in 1908, merging in 1966 with Vosper & Company to form one organisation called Vosper Thornycroft. From 2002 to 2010 the company acquired several international and US-based defence and services companies, and changed name to the VT Group. In 2008 VT's UK shipbuilding and support operations were merged with those of BAE Systems to create BVT Surface Fleet. In 2010 remaining parts of the company were absorbed by Babcock International who retained the UK and international operations, but sold the US based operations to the American Jordan Company, who took the name VT Group.

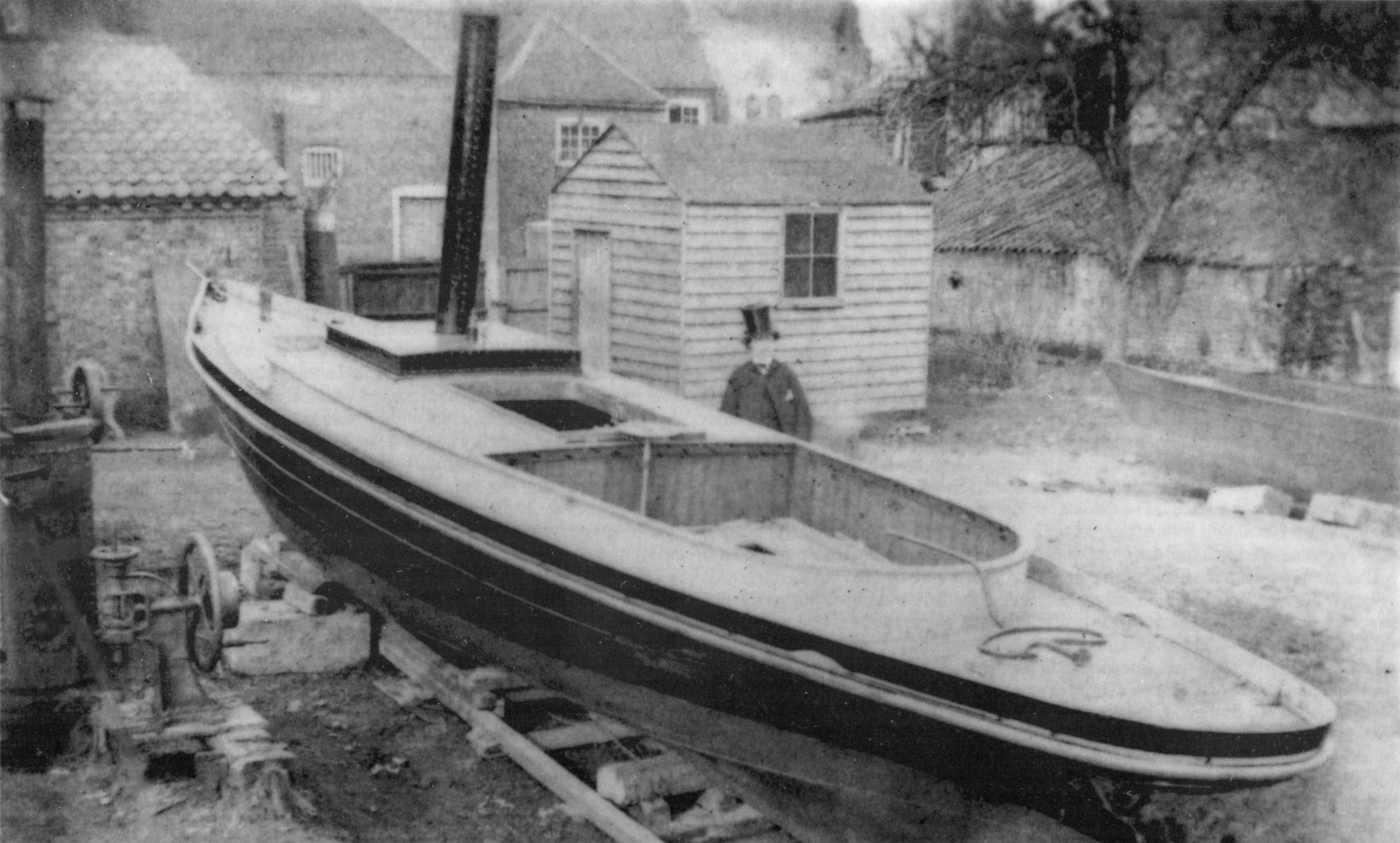
Thornycroft with his first boat, Nautilus

== History ==
John Isaac Thornycroft had shown shipbuilding ability when, aged 16, he began building a small steam launch in 1859. The vessel was named Nautilus and in 1862 it proved to be the first steam launch with enough speed to follow the contenders in the University race. The ensuing publicity prompted his father, the sculptor Thomas Thornycroft, to purchase a strip of land along the Thames at Chiswick in 1864, and that became the start of John I. Thornycroft & Co.

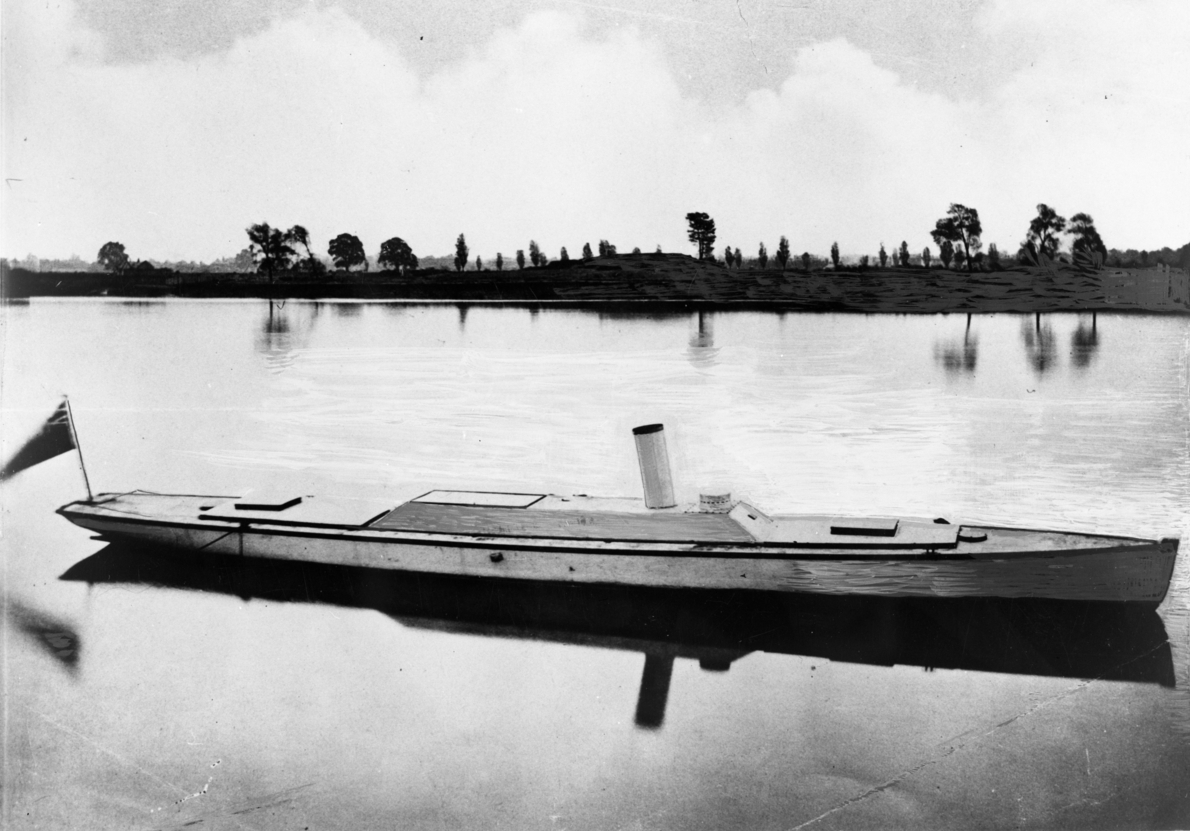
Rap of 1873 marked the start of Thornycroft's torpedo boat business

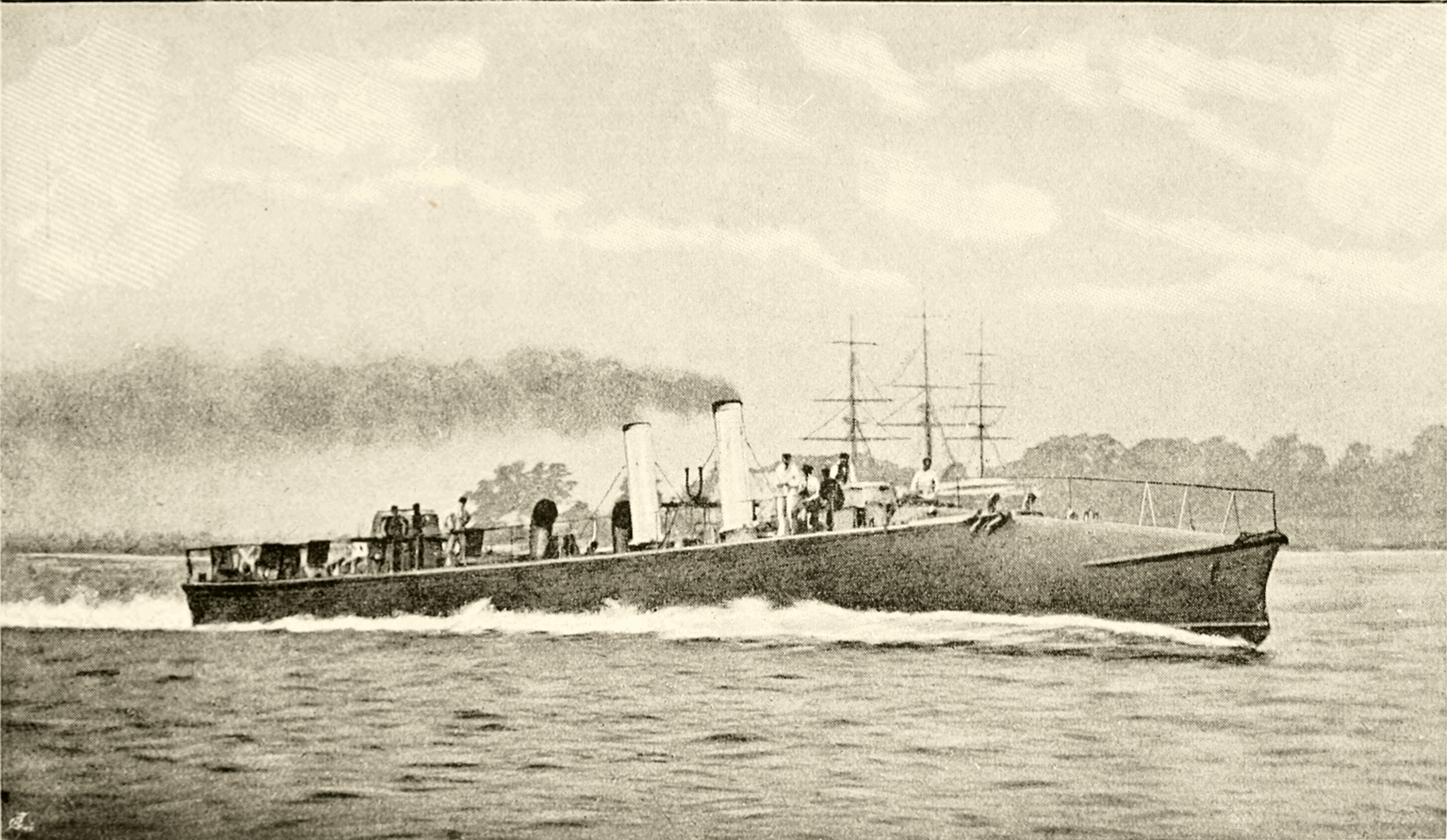
Ariete, built for Spain in 1887, was an example of still larger torpedo boats

=== The yard at Chiswick ===
In its first ten years the yard had a very modest production, mostly building steam launches and steam yachts. The breakthrough came in 1873, when the firm built the small steel torpedo craft Rap for the Navy of Norway, followed by similar boats for other navies, and by HMS Lightning for the Royal Navy in 1877. Torpedoes and torpedo boats were seen as weapons of the future and throughout the 1870s and 1880s the Thornycroft yard became a major supplier to a number of navies. As Banbury put it:

No high-pressure salesmanship was needed to sell torpedo-boats in the nineteenth century; on the contrary, the customers queued up.

— Philip Banbury

The original boats had locomotive-type boilers but, like its competitors, the company developed a water-tube boiler, patented in 1885 and providing more speed. The size of the vessels grew steadily, exceeding 100 tons with Ariete, delivered to Spain in 1887 and 200 tons in the Daring-class torpedo-boat destroyers of the Royal Navy. The largest vessel built at Chiswick was the Alarm-class torpedo gunboat Speedy of 810 tons. In the 1870s, the company developed a class of river gunboat with the propellers partly enclosed in tunnels within the hull, to reduce the danger of damage when operating in shallow water. During the 1890s it became increasingly difficult for the new vessels to pass under the Hammersmith Bridge – masts and funnels had to be lowered or removed, and put back in place again further down the Thames, and if something went wrong during trials and the boat had to return to the yard, then the whole process had to be reversed. In 1904 the former Oswald Mordaunt yard at Woolston was acquired from Mordey, Carney & Co, and production of larger ships gradually moved there. At its peak, the yard at Chiswick employed 1,700 men. The production of destroyers at the yard caught the imagination of the writer H. G. Wells, who let George Ponderevo, main character of the book Tono-Bungay, become a destroyer designer in the last chapter, describing a test run of the destroyer X 2 under the Hammersmith Bridge and out into the open sea. The Church Wharf, Chiswick yard finally closed in August 1909.

In the years at Chiswick, John Thornycroft increasingly concentrated on the design and development part of the enterprise, while his brother-in-law since 1872, John Donaldson (1841-1899), managed the commercial side. When Donaldson died in 1899, a group of industrialists headed by William Beardmore bought into the company, and they provided much of the financing when it was transformed into the public company John I. Thornycroft and Co. Ltd in 1901, with Beardmore as chairman. William Beardmore's interest in the company proved rather short-lived and he resigned as chairman in 1907. The management team of the new company consisted of John Thornycroft's son, John Edward Thornycroft as manager, and John Donaldson's son, Thornycroft Donaldson (ca. 1883–1955) as technical director.

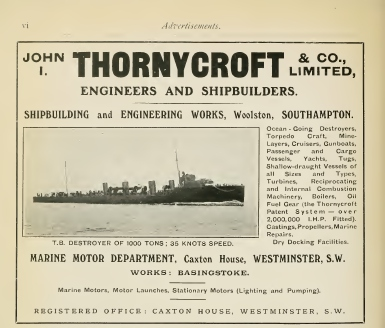
Advertisement for J.I. Thornycroft & Co. in Brassey's Naval Annual 1915

=== The yard at Woolston ===
The first ship built by Thornycrofts for the Royal Navy at the Woolston Yard was the Tribal-class destroyer HMS Tartar. Up to the start of World War I, the yard built 37 destroyers for the Royal Navy and several more for other navies. During the war, the yard made 26 destroyers, 3 submarines and a large number of smaller craft for the Royal Navy. Notable among the smaller craft were the Coastal Motor Boats (built at Hampton – see below), based on a design by John Thornycroft (the elder) who continued working with hull designs at his home on the Isle of Wight until his death in 1928, taking out his last patent in 1924. His daughter, naval architect Blanche Thornycroft worked alongside him (and after his death) testing models, calculating and recording results.

The construction of smaller boats did not move to Woolston, but to a new yard (Hampton Launch Works) on Platt's Eyot in the Thames at Hampton. The construction on Platt's Eyot included yachts and – during the two world wars – a large number of small vessels for the Royal Navy. The yachts included Enola (1928), Estrellita (1934) (now called Rake's Retreat), Aberdonia (1935), and Moonyeen (1937). The pre-war motor yacht Prunella may also have been built at Hampton. These four have survived and are now recorded on National Historic Ships' National Register. Four boat sheds on the site survived until 2021 when they were largely destroyed by fire.

In the inter-war years there was still some construction for the Royal Navy at Woolston, but the yard also built civilian ships, like the ferry SS Robert Coryndon for Uganda in 1930. She apparently still survives, but as a half-submerged wreck on the shore of Lake Albert. When World War II broke out, production was stepped up again, and the yard built corvettes and destroyers. Production was delayed by several bombings, probably influenced by the yard's proximity to the Spitfire-building Supermarine factory, also situated in Woolston. That factory was bombed extensively in the beginning of the war, and Thornycroft's yard received its fair share of the bombs. Among the more notable ships built by the yard in the war years were the two Hunt-class destroyer escorts, HMS Bissenden and HMS Brecon, (Type IV) with better stability than their sisters. The largest naval vessel built at Woolston during the war years was the fast minelayer HMS Latona of 2,650 tons, with turbines capable of 72,000 shaft horsepower (53,690 kW) and a speed of 40 knots (74 km/h; 46 mph).

The first seaworthy Assault Landing Craft (ALC), later renamed LCA, Landing Craft Assault, ordered built for the British Navy were by Thornycroft. The first prototype ALC No 1 was built by J. Samuel White of Cowes to a design by Fleming Jenkin, but it was not very successful. Thornycroft's design was much closer to what the navy wanted, with its low silhouette, silenced engines and shallow draught. Designated ALC No 2, it was 41 ft 6 in (12.6 m) long overall and driven by two Ford V8 engines of 65 brake horsepower (48 kW) each. The design was slightly modified by the Admiralty and some 1,929 were built during World War II. In 1944 sixty were being built each month. The LCA was reasonably seaworthy, so long as waves were less than 5 ft (2 m) high. In heavy seas the situation could become critical and a number of LCAs converted to support craft disappeared in the choppy seas of D-Day, 6 June 1944. In 1944 267 were lost (out of 371 losses during the whole war).

In 1955, the company built Scillonian, a passenger ferry built for the Isles of Scilly Steamship Company.

In July 1960 John Ward Thornycroft, John Edward Thornycroft's son, replaced his father as chairman of the company.

In 1962, John I. Thornycroft and Sons was building wooden yachts in Singapore.

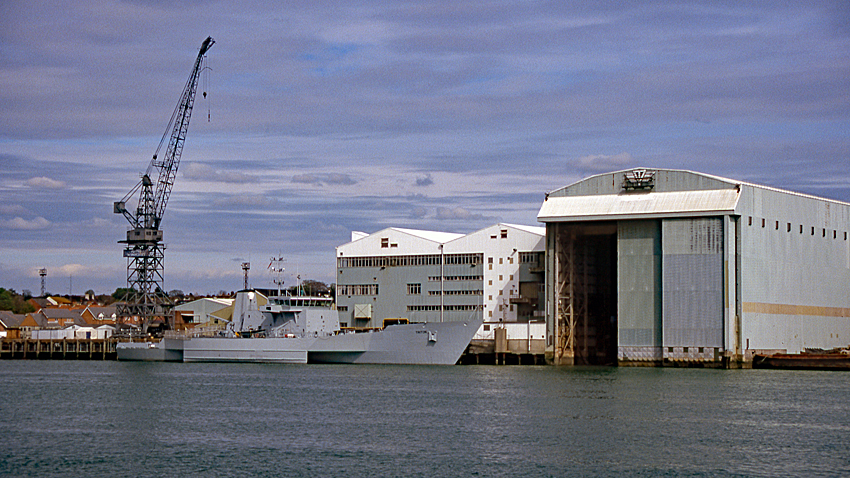
Vosper Thornycroft shipyard at Woolston

In 1966, Thornycrofts merged with Vosper & Company, part of the David Brown Group, to form one organisation called, by 1970, Vosper Thornycroft. The merger made sense, because Thornycroft had yard space but few orders, while Vosper had the orders but lacked space. The combined company built new facilities at Woolston and production continued there until 2004. However, by 2003, the company had outgrown even those facilities, and it was decided to move production to a new yard at Portchester, Hampshire.

Later, Vosper Thornycroft changed its business name to VT Group and, in 2010, was absorbed by Babcock International, which integrated the UK portion of VT Group into its own business. In 2012, Babcock sold the US-based operation, and the VT Group name, to the Jordan Company. Shipbuilding successor of Thornycroft continues as BAE Systems Surface Ships in Portsmouth.

== Royal Navy classes built by Thornycroft ==
- D-class destroyer (1913)
- Coastal Motor Boats
- Thornycroft type leader
- Thornycroft M-class destroyer
- Type IV Hunt-class destroyer
- Landing Craft Assault
- HMS Duchess – Daring class destroyer 1952
- HMS Palawan and Panglima – 75' patrol boats built in 1937 for RNVR in Singapore at the Tanjong Rhu Shipyard (1926-1986)

== Extant ships ==
- LV 78 Calshot Spit (1914), at Solent Sky museum, Southampton
- AML Cavalier Maxim (1962), tour vessel in the Port of Montreal
