= HMS Vesuvius (1874) =

History

United Kingdom
- Name: HMS Vesuvius
- Builder: Pembroke Dockyard
- Laid down: 16 March 1873
- Launched: 24 March 1874
- Completed: 11 September 1874
- Fate: Sold for scrap 1923

General characteristics
- Displacement: 245 long tons (249 t)
- Length: 90 ft 0 in (27.43 m) pp
- Beam: 22 ft 0 in (6.71 m)
- Draught: 8 ft 6 in (2.59 m)
- Installed power: 350 ihp (260 kW)
- Propulsion: 2× compound steam engines; 2 shafts
- Speed: 9.7 kn (11.2 mph; 18.0 km/h)
- Complement: 15
- Armament: 1 × 16 inch torpedo tube

HMS Vesuvius was an experimental torpedo-armed warship of the British Royal Navy. Built by Pembroke Dockyard in 1873–1874, she was the first purpose-designed torpedo vessel built for the Royal Navy. Vesuvius was intended for night attacks against enemy harbours, and was armed with a single tube for Whitehead torpedoes in her bow. She was used for experimental and training purposes, and was not disposed of until 1923.

== Design ==
From 1864, the English engineer Robert Whitehead, based at Fiume in the Austrian empire (now Rijeka in Croatia), began work on a self-propelled, or "locomotive" torpedo which would run underwater, powered by compressed air. (Note: As opposed to spar torpedoes, which were mounted on the end of a long boom attached to the bows of an attacking ship.) By 1868, Whitehead had solved the problem of depth control, and was offering his torpedo to the navies of the world. After trials from the sloop Oberon in September–October 1868, the Admiralty purchased a license to build Whitehead's torpedo, with production beginning at the Royal Arsenal at Woolwich, London in 1872.

On 12 February 1872, the Admiralty placed an order for its first ship purpose designed for torpedo attack, HMS Vesuvius. The new warship was intended for night attacks against enemy harbours, with the likely opponent being France.

Vesuvius was 90 feet 0 inches (27.43 m) long between perpendiculars, with a beam of 22 feet 0 inches (6.71 m) and a draught of 8 feet 6 inches (2.59 m). Displacement was 382 long tons (388 t) normal. Freeboard was low to make the ship more difficult to spot. The ship was powered by compound steam engines rated at 382 indicated horsepower (285 kW) which drove two propeller shafts, giving a speed of 9.7 knots (11.2 mph; 18.0 km/h). The ship's engines were designed to minimise noise to aid in making stealthy attacks, while her boilers were fuelled by coke to minimise the production of smoke, which was designed to be vented underwater to further reduce the ship's conspicuousness.

The ship was fitted with a single submerged torpedo tube in her bow capable of launching 16-inch torpedoes. The torpedo tube was 19 feet (5.8 m) long and 2 feet (0.6 m) in diameter, with the torpedo running on rollers within the tube. A total of ten torpedoes were carried, each about 14 feet (4.3 m) long and carrying a warhead of 67 pounds (30 kg) of guncotton. No guns were carried. The ship had a crew of 15.

Vesuvius was laid down at Pembroke Dockyard on 16 March 1873 and launched on 24 March 1874. She was towed to Portsmouth Dockyard for fitting out, and a tall funnel was added to aid raising of steam. She was completed on 11 September 1874 at a cost of £17,897.

== Service ==
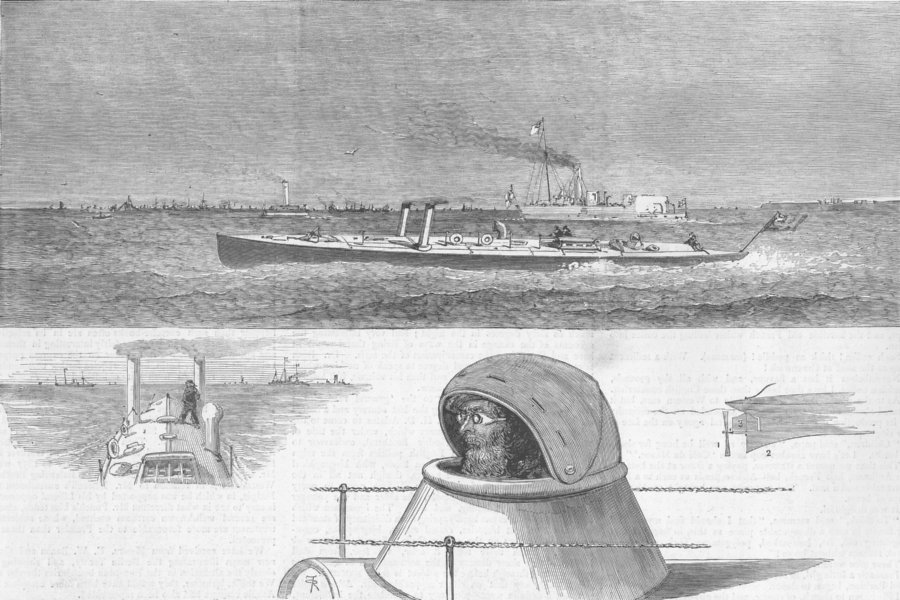
Vesuvius and Lightning, appeared at the Naval Review at Spithead in 1878. The Graphic

The boat appeared at the Naval Review at Spithead of August 1878. The Queen recorded in her Journal that she was impressed by the 2 torpedo boats, Vesuvius & Lightning, which rushed about at the rate of 20 Knots an hour.

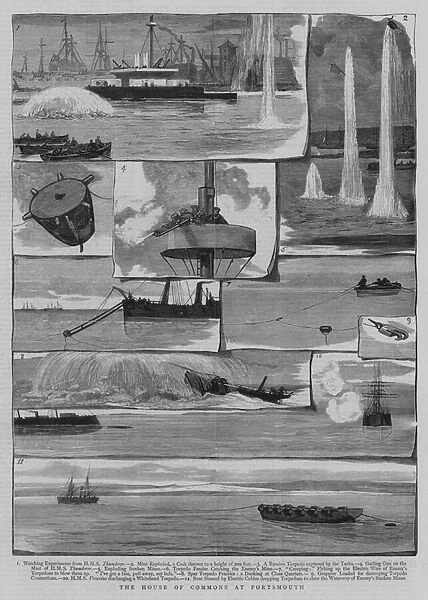
The House of Commons at Portsmouth witness torpedo trials involving Vesuvius. The Graphic 1878

Vesuvius was not seriously evaluated against her design role of night torpedo attacks and was too slow and had too short a range to accompany the fleet. She was relegated to experimental and training roles, attached to HMS Vernon, the Royal Navy's torpedo training school. In 1886–1887, Vesuvius took part in a series of trials to test anti-torpedo nets, firing torpedoes against the old ironclad Resistance. The conclusion of the tests were that anti-torpedo nets were an effective protection against torpedoes.

Vesuvius remained attached to HMS Vernon at Portsmouth during the First World War, and was finally sold for scrap on 14 September 1923 to the shipbreakers Cashmore, she foundered under tow to Cashmore's yard at Newport.
