= Chilean torpedo gunboat Almirante Lynch =

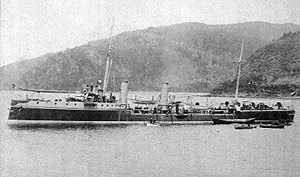
- Torpedo gunboat Almirante Lynch

History

Chile
- Name: Almirante Lynch
- Namesake: Patricio Lynch
- Builder: Laird Brothers, Birkenhead
- Laid down: 1889
- Launched: 1890
- Commissioned: 1890
- Decommissioned: 1919
- Renamed: Tomas, 1913
- Fate: Scrapped

General characteristics
- Class & type: Almirante Lynch-class torpedo gunboat
- Displacement: 713 t (702 long tons)
- Length: 70 m (229 ft 8 in) p/p
- Beam: 8 m (26 ft 3 in)
- Draught: 1 m (3 ft 3 in) forward; 6 m (19 ft 8 in) aft
- Propulsion: 2 steam engines, 3.38 MW (4,533 hp); 4 cylindrical boilers; 2 screws
- Speed: 20.2 knots (37.4 km/h; 23.2 mph)
- Range: 2,500 nmi (4,600 km; 2,900 mi)
- Complement: 87
- Armament: 1890 : 5 × 356 mm (14 in) torpedo tubes; 3 × 76.2 mm (3.00 in) 12-pounder guns; 4 × 3-pounder Hotchkiss guns; 2 machine guns

The torpedo gunboat Almirante Lynch and her sister ship Almirante Condell, were purchased in England and launched in 1890.

== Design ==
The vessels had a high forecastle and poop, and a ram on the bow. the hulls were steel. The principal armament was five Whitehead torpedo tubes, one in the bow and two in each broadside. They also had two 76.2 mm (3.00 in) 12-pounder guns in echelon on the forecastle and one on the poop, four 3-pounder guns, and two machine guns.

== Service history ==
Almirante Lynch was part of the small force of ships at disposal of President José Manuel Balmaceda in the 1891 Chilean Civil War. During the war, on April 23, 1891, Almirante Lynch and her sister ship Almirante Condell attacked and sank the rebel ironclad frigate Blanco Encalada. Early in April a portion of the revolutionary squadron, comprising Blanco Encalada and other ships, was sent southward for reconnoitering purposes and put into the port of Caldera. During the night of April 23, and whilst Blanco Encalada was lying quietly at anchor in Caldera Bay, Almirante Lynch, belonging to the Balmaceda faction, steamed into the bay of Caldera and discharged a torpedo at the rebel ship. Blanco Encalada sank in a few minutes and 300 of her crew perished. This coup severely weakened the Congressional squadron. This was the first successful torpedo attack on a warship.

Australian poet Banjo Paterson celebrated the gunboat (with not much accuracy to the facts) in his poem "The Boss of the 'Admiral Lynch'".

After the arrival of the destroyer Almirante Lynch the torpedo gunboat was renamed Tomas.

== See also ==
- Sharpshooter-class torpedo gunboat
- Sinking of USS Housatonic
- South American dreadnought race
- List of decommissioned ships of the Chilean Navy
