= HMS Lightning (1876) =

1876 torpedo boat

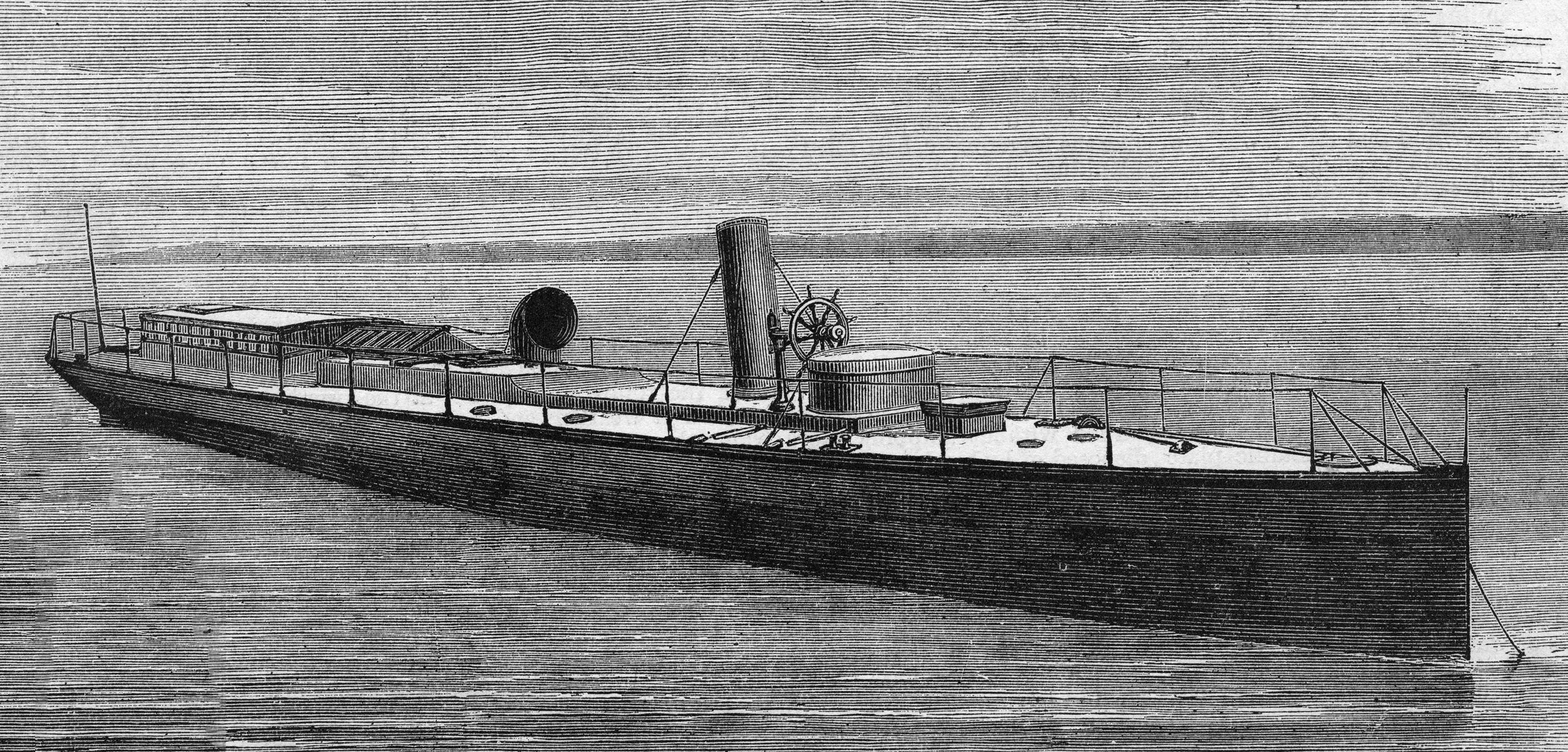
- HMS Lightning - illustration from Scientific American.

History

United Kingdom
- Builder: John I. Thornycroft & Company
- Launched: 1876
- Renamed: Torpedo Boat No. 1
- Fate: Scrapped, 1896

General characteristics
- Class & type: Torpedo boat
- Displacement: 32.5 long tons (33.0 t)
- Length: 87 ft 6 in (26.67 m)
- Beam: 10 ft 9 in (3.28 m)
- Draught: 5 ft 2 in (1.57 m)
- Propulsion: Two-cylinder compound steam engine, 460 hp (340 kW)
- Speed: 18.5 kn (34.3 km/h)
- Armament: 2 × 14 inch Whitehead torpedoes; (later reduced to one)

HMS Lightning was a torpedo boat, built by John Thornycroft at Church Wharf in Chiswick for the Royal Navy, which entered service in 1876 and was the first seagoing vessel to be armed with self-propelled Whitehead torpedoes. She was later renamed Torpedo Boat No. 1.

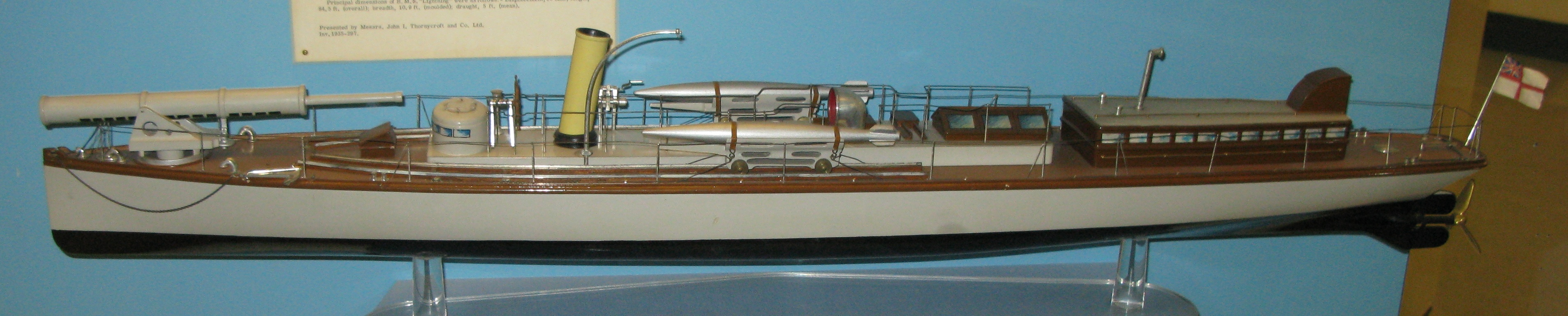
A model of HMS Lightning

As originally built, Lightning had two drop collars to launch torpedoes; these were replaced in 1879 by a single torpedo tube in the bow. She also carried two reload torpedoes amidships.

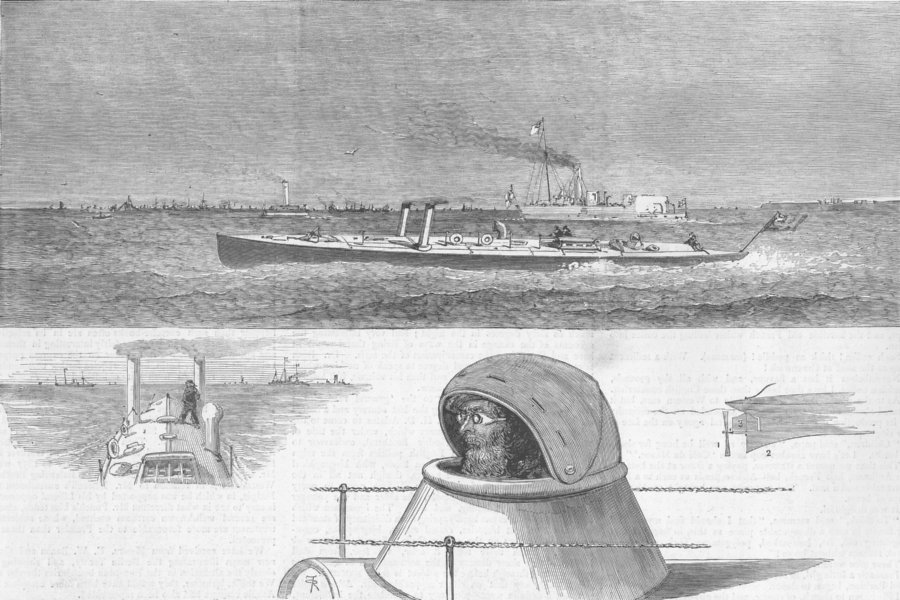
Vesuvius and Lightning, appeared at the Naval Review at Spithead in 1878. The Graphic

The boat appeared at the Naval Review at Spithead of August 1878. The Queen recorded in her Journal that she was impressed by the 2 torpedo boats, Vesuvius & Lightning, which rushed about at the rate of 20 Knots an hour. The Lightning spent her life as a tender to the torpedo school HMS Vernon at Portsmouth and was used for some experiments. She was broken up in 1896.
