= Almirante Lynch-class torpedo gunboat =

Chilean Navy ship class (1891–1919)

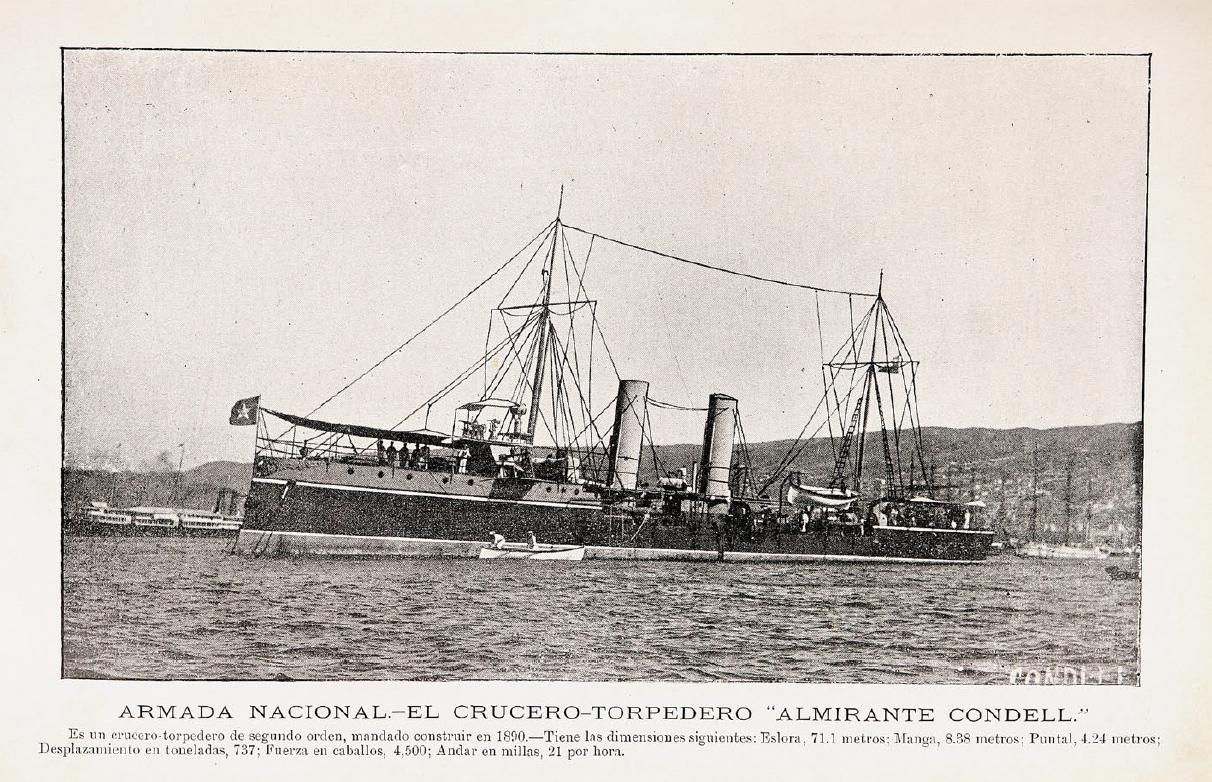
- Almirante Condell in 1903

Class overview
- Name: Almirante Lynch class
- Builders: Laird Brothers, Birkenhead, UK
- Operators: Chilean Navy
- Preceded by: None
- Succeeded by: Almirante Simpson
- Built: 1889–1890
- In commission: 1891–1919
- Completed: 2
- Scrapped: 2

General characteristics
- Type: Torpedo gunboat
- Displacement: 713 t (702 long tons)
- Length: 70.1 m (230 ft 0 in) p/p
- Beam: 8.38 m (27 ft 6 in)
- Draught: 2.53 m (8.3 ft)
- Installed power: 4 locomotive boilers; 4,532 ihp (3,380 kW)
- Propulsion: 2 steam engines, 3.38 MW (4,533 hp); 4 cylindrical boilers; 2 screws
- Speed: 20.2 knots (37.4 km/h; 23.2 mph)
- Range: 2,500 nmi (4,600 km; 2,900 mi)
- Complement: 87
- Armament: 1890 : 5 × 356 mm (14 in) torpedo tubes; 3 × 76.2 mm (3.00 in) 12-pounder guns; 4 × 3-pounder Hotchkiss guns; 2 machine guns

The Almirante Lynch class was a pair of two torpedo gunboats, Almirante Lynch and Almirante Condell, ordered for the Chilean Navy in the late 1880s.

== Ships ==
Ship	Namesake	Builder	Laid down	Launched	Fate
Almirante Lynch	Patricio Lynch	Laird Brothers, Birkenhead, UK	1889	1890	Stricken 1919
Almirante Condell	Carlos Condell	Laird Brothers, Birkenhead, UK	1889	1890	Stricken 1919

== See also ==
- Sharpshooter-class torpedo gunboat
