= List of ship launches in 1893 =

The list of ship launches in 1893 includes a chronological list of some ships launched in 1893.

Date	Ship	Class / type	Builder	Location	Country	Notes
3 January	Asie	Sailing ship	Forges et Chantiers de la Méditerranée	Le Havre	France	For H. Auger, ainé
2 February	Lucania	Ocean liner	Fairfield Shipbuilding and Engineering Company	Govan	United Kingdom	For Cunard Line
4 February	Mystic	Ferry	Harland & Wolff	Belfast	United Kingdom	For Belfast Steamship Co.
16 February	Gaul	Passenger ship	Harland & Wolff	Belfast	United Kingdom	For Union Steamship Co.
18 February	Torpilleur N° 177	36-metre type Normand (1891 tranche) 1st class Torpedo boat	Forges et Chantiers de la Méditerranée	Le Havre	France	For French Navy
28 February	Indiana	Indiana-class battleship	William Cramp & Sons	Philadelphia	United States	
4 March	Jean Bart	Steamship	Forges et Chantiers de la Méditerranée	Le Havre	France	For Chamber of Commerce (Dunkerque)
7 March	Orcana	Passenger ship	Harland & Wolff	Belfast	United Kingdom	For Pacific Steam Navigation Company.
16 March	Goth	Passenger ship	Harland & Wolff	Belfast	United Kingdom	For Union Steamship Co.
18 March	Alexandre Pétion	Capois La Mort-class Gunboat	Forges et Chantiers de la Méditerranée	Le Havre	France	For Haitian Navy
18 March	Amiral Charner	Amiral Charner-class cruiser	Arsenal de Rochefort	Rochefort	France	For French Navy
1 April	Le Lion	Sailing vessel	Forges et Chantiers de la Méditerranée	Le Havre	France	For: Deutsch & Cie.
17 April	Friant	Friant-class cruiser	Arsenal de Brest	Brest	France	For French Navy
19 April	Capois La Mort	Capois La Mort-class Gunboat	Forges et Chantiers de la Méditerranée	Le Havre	France	For Haitian Navy
20 April	Magic	Ferry	Harland & Wolff	Belfast	United Kingdom	For Belfast Steamship Co.
15 May	Westmeath	Cargo ship	Swan & Hunter	Wallsend	United Kingdom	For Shaw, Savill and Albion Line
16 May	Amiral Tréhouart	Coast defence ship	Arsenal de Lorient	Lorient	France	For French Navy
18 May	Greek	Passenger ship	Harland & Wolff	Belfast	United Kingdom	For Union Steamship Co.
May	L.R. Doty	Wooden-hulled bulk carrier steamship	F.W. Wheeler & Co.	Cleveland	United States	Sunk in storm October 25, 1898 on Lake Michigan
10 June	Massachusetts	Indiana-class battleship	William Cramp & Sons	Philadelphia	United States	
17 June	Sarmiento	Passenger ship	Harland & Wolff	Belfast	United Kingdom	For Pacific Steam Navigation Company.
28 June	Gothic	Ocean Liner	Harland & Wolff	Belfast	United Kingdom	For White Star Line.
29 June	Sachem	Passenger ship	Harland & Wolff	Belfast	United Kingdom	For George Warren & Co.
3 July	Gangut	Coastal defense ship	New Admiralty Shipyard	Saint Petersburg	Russia	
3 August	Magellan	Cargo ship	Harland & Wolff	Belfast	United Kingdom	For Pacific Steam Navigation Company.
10 August	Suchet	Protected cruiser	Arsenal de Toulon	Toulon	France	For French Navy
11 August	Lemgo	Steamship	Blyth Shipbuilding Co. Ltd	Blyth	United Kingdom	For W. C. A. Holzapfel.
29 August	Charles Martel	Pre-dreadnought battleship	Brest	Arsenal de Brest	France	French Navy
29 August	Bugeaud	Friant-class cruiser	Arsenal de Cherbourg	Cherbourg	France	For French Navy
8 September	Tearaght	Lighthouse tender	W. Allsup & Sons Ltd.	Preston	United Kingdom	For Commissioners of Irish Lights.
23 September	Cevic	Livestock carrier	Harland & Wolff	Belfast	United Kingdom	For White Star Line.
12 October	Inca	Cargo ship	Harland & Wolff	Belfast	United Kingdom	For Pacific Steam Navigation Company.
26 October	Oregon	Indiana-class battleship	Union Iron Works	San Francisco, California	United States	
27 October	Jauréguiberry	Pre-dreadnought battleship	Forges et Chantiers de la Méditerranée	La Seyne	France	For: French Navy
27 October	Shearwater	Lightship	W. Allsup & Sons Ltd.	Preston	United Kingdom	For Commissioners of Irish Lights.
1 November	Admiral Ushakov	Admiral Ushakov-class coastal defense ship	New Admiralty Shipyard	Saint Petersburg	Russia	
9 November	Templemore	Cargo ship	Harland & Wolff	Belfast	United Kingdom	For William Johnstone.
12 November	Tri Sviatitelia	Pre-dreadnought battleship	Nikolayev Admiralty Shipyard	Nikolayev	Russia	
16 November	Lepanto	Reina Regente-class protected cruiser	Arsenal de Cartagena	Cartagena	Spain	For Spanish Navy
24 November	Guillemot	Lightship	W. Allsup & Sons Ltd.	Preston	United Kingdom	For Commissioners of Irish Lights.
7 December	Staffordshire	Cargo ship	Harland & Wolff	Belfast	United Kingdom	For Bibby Steamship Co.
Unknown date	Alfred Corry	Carvel-class lifeboat	Beeching Brothers Ltd.	Great Yarmouth	United Kingdom	For Royal National Lifeboat Institution.
Unknown date	Message	Steamship	J. Branford	Knottingley	United Kingdom	For J. Branford.
Unknown date	Mystery	Sloop	Brown & Clapson	Barton-upon-Humber	United Kingdom	For James Barraclough & Henry Oldridge.
