= Bouvines-class ironclad =

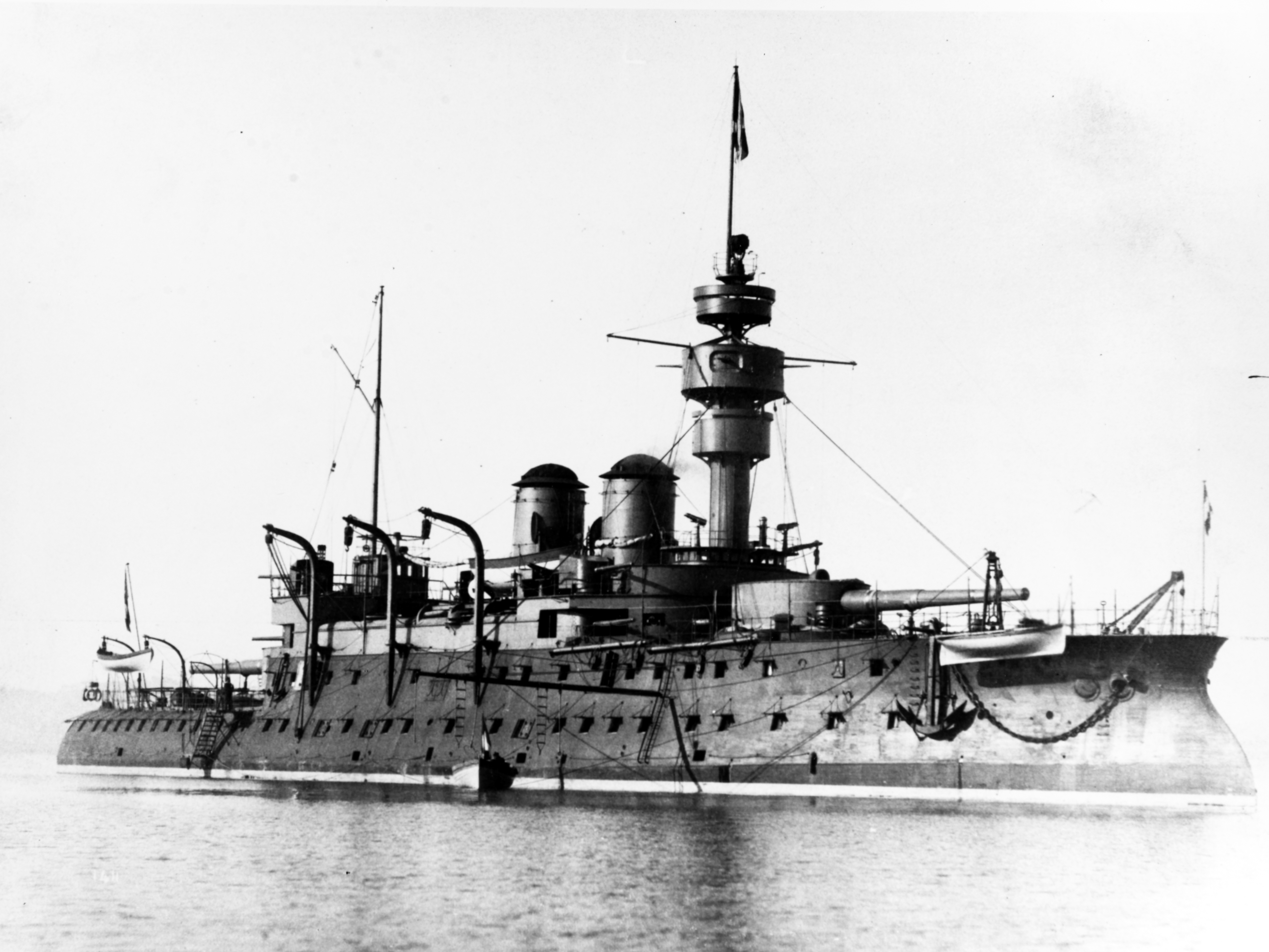
- Bouvines in early 1895

Class overview
- Name: Bouvines
- Operators: French Navy
- Preceded by: Jemmapes class
- Succeeded by: Henri IV
- Cost: FF14,986,587 (Bouvines)
- Built: 1890–1896
- In service: 1895–1918
- In commission: 1895–1913
- Completed: 2
- Scrapped: 2

General characteristics (as built)
- Type: Coastal-defense ship
- Displacement: 6,798 t (6,691 long tons)
- Length: 89.65 m (294 ft 2 in) (o/a)
- Beam: 17.86 m (58 ft 7 in)
- Draft: 7.54 m (24.7 ft)
- Installed power: 16 water-tube boilers; 8,865 ihp (6,611 kW)
- Propulsion: 2 shafts, 2 triple-expansion steam engines
- Speed: 16 knots (30 km/h; 18 mph) (at trials)
- Range: 3,900 nautical miles (7,200 km; 4,500 mi) at 8 knots (15 km/h; 9.2 mph)
- Complement: 333 (371 as flagship)
- Armament: 2 × single 305 mm (12 in) guns; 8 × single 100 mm (3.9 in) guns; 4 × single 47 mm (1.9 in) guns; 10 × single 37 mm (1.5 in) guns; 2 × 450 mm (17.7 in) torpedo tubes
- Armor: Belt: 250–464 mm (9.8–18.3 in); Decks: 92 mm (3.6 in); Conning tower: 80 mm (3.1 in); Turrets: 320 mm (12.6 in)

The Bouvines class consisted of a pair of ironclad coastal-defense ships built for the French Navy (Marine nationale) in the 1890s, Bouvines and Amiral Tréhouart. Thoroughly obsolete by World War I, the ships only played a minor role during the war. They were sold for scrap in 1920.

== Design and description ==
In 1887 preliminary design work began on an armored coast-defence ship intended to serve as the centerpiece of a group of torpedo boats under the auspices of Admiral Théophile Aube, Minister of the Navy and Colonies, and an ardent exponent of the Jeune École (Young School) of naval strategy that believed in the primacy of coastal defences and commerce raiding. The torpedo warfare role was eventually dropped and four coast-defence ironclads, the Jemmapes and the Bouvines classes, were ordered in 1889.

The Bouvines-class ships were half-sisters to the Jemmapes class laid down at the same time. They were virtually identical except that the Bouvines were given a forecastle deck to improve seaworthiness and the main armament was lightened to compensate for the additional weight, as 305 mm (12 in) guns were installed rather than the 340 mm (13.4 in) guns of the Jemmapes class.

Bouvines and Amiral Tréhouart were 89.38 m (293 ft 3 in) long at the waterline and 89.65 m (294 ft 2 in) long overall. They had a beam of 17.86 m (58 ft 7 in) and a draft of 6.38 m (20 ft 11 in) forward and 7.54 m (24 ft 9 in) aft. They were only slightly heavier than the Jemmapes class and displaced 6,798 metric tons (6,691 long tons), only 300 metric tons (295 long tons) more than the other ships. Bouvines had a metacentric height of 1.04 metres (3.4 ft). Once in service they proved to roll badly so bilge keels were later fitted. Their crew numbered 15 officers and 318 ratings; service as a flagship added 5 more officers and 33 more ratings.

The Bouvines-class ships used two inclined horizontal triple-expansion steam engines built by Menpenti of Marseille, one engine per shaft. Bouvines's engines were powered by 16 (Note: Stourton says 18 boilers.) d'Allest-Lagrafel water-tube boilers and had two funnels, but Amiral Tréhouart used the same number of Belleville boilers instead and had only one funnel. The engines produced a total of 8,865 indicated horsepower (6,611 kW) and gave a top speed of 16.05 knots (29.72 km/h; 18.47 mph) on trials. The ships carried a maximum of 557 metric tons (548 long tons) of coal which allowed them to steam for 3,900 nautical miles (7,200 km; 4,500 mi) at a speed of 8 knots (15 km/h; 9.2 mph).

=== Armament and armor ===
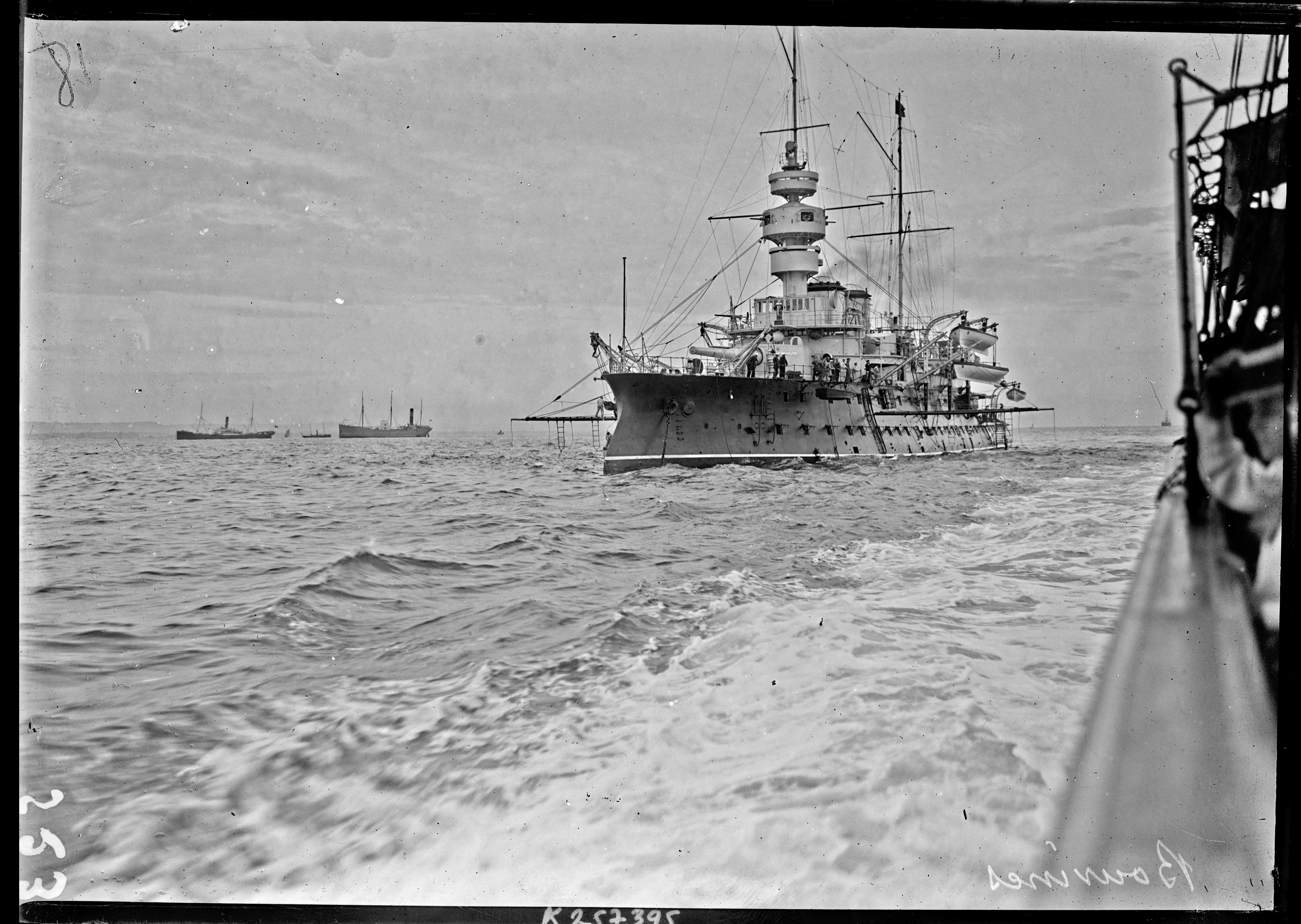
Bouvines in 1905

Like the Jemmapes class, the Bouvines-class ships carried their main armament of two 45-caliber Canon de 305 mm Modèle 1887 guns in two single-gun turrets, one each fore and aft of the superstructure. The guns fired 340-kilogram (750 lb) projectiles at the rate of one round per minute at a muzzle velocity of approximately 780 metres per second (2,600 ft/s). The guns could be depressed to −4° and elevation to +10°.

The ships' secondary armament consisted of eight 53-caliber Canon de 100 mm (3.9 in) Modèle 1892 guns, four of which were mounted in individual casemates. The other four were carried on pivot mounts with gun shields on the shelter deck directly above the four casemated guns on the corners of the superstructure. The guns fired 16-kilogram (35 lb) shells at a muzzle velocity of 730 metres per second (2,400 ft/s).

Initially four 40-caliber 47 mm (1.9 in) Canon de 47 mm Modèle 1885 Hotchkiss guns were carried for defence from torpedo boats in the fighting top in the military mast, but this was later increased to eight, with the new guns on the superstructure. They fired a 1.5-kilogram (3.3 lb) projectile at 650 metres per second (2,100 ft/s) to a maximum range of 4,000 metres (4,400 yd). Initially ten 37-millimetre (1.5 in) Hotchkiss revolving cannon were positioned on the superstructure, but this was reduced to three when the additional 47 mm guns were added. Two 450-millimetre (17.7 in) torpedo tubes were mounted above the waterline, but they were removed in 1906.

The armor of the Bouvines-class ships weighted 2,270 tonnes (2,230 long tons). They had a complete waterline armor belt of steel that tapered from the maximum thickness of 464 mm (18.3 in) amidships to 250 mm (9.8 in) at the ship's ends. The belt's height was an average of 1.9 m (6.2 ft), but increased to 2.86 metres (9.4 ft) at the bow and to 2.18 metres (7.2 ft) at the stern. The ships were intended to have 40 centimetres (15.7 in) of the belt showing above the waterline, but they were overweight as completed and only 24 centimetres (9.4 in) of the belt was above the waterline. The hull above the belt was completely unarmored. The maximum thickness of the armored deck was 92 mm (3.6 in) and it was joined to the top of the armor belt. The main turret armor was 370 mm (14.6 in) thick although the barbettes were only 320 mm (12.6 in) thick. The plates protecting the conning tower measured 80 mm (3.1 in) in thickness.

== Ships ==
Bouvines was authorized in the Supplementary Estimates of 1889 although Amiral Tréhouart had been authorized in the 1889 Ordinary Naval Estimates with the name of Tréhouart, although she was renamed on 25 March 1895. Bouvines was ordered on 18 December 1889.

Name	Namesake	Builder	Laid down	Launched	Commissioned	Fate
Amiral Tréhouart	François Thomas Tréhouart	Arsenal de Lorient	20 October 1890	16 May 1893	29 June 1896	Sold for scrap, 4 July 1920
Bouvines	Battle of Bouvines	Forges et Chantiers de la Méditerranée, La Seyne-sur-Mer	30 September 1890	23 March 1892	1 December 1895	Sold for scrap, 19 June 1920

== History ==
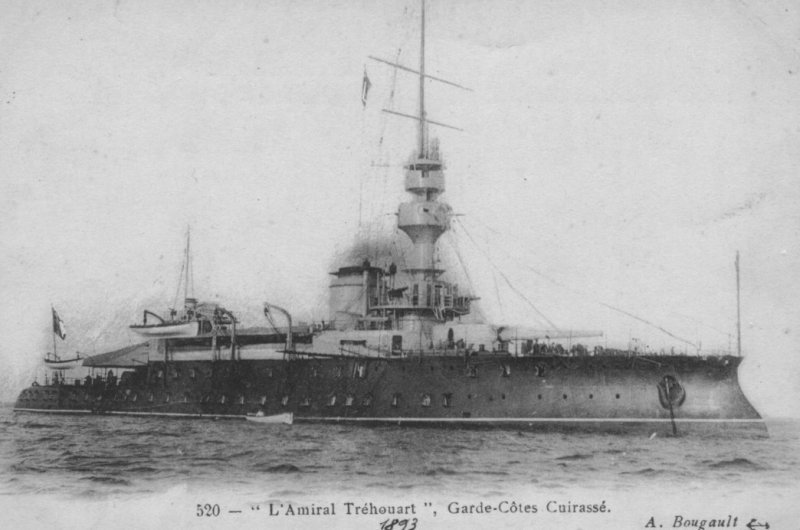
A post card of Amiral Tréhouart

Bouvines served as a flagship for the entirety of her active service where she served both in the Northern Squadron and Channel Flotilla in the Bay of Biscay and the English Channel as well as in the Mediterranean Squadron. She was stricken on 1 July 1913 and was used by the Inspection Service at Cherbourg between 1914 and 1917. She was condemned in 1918 and sold for scrapping in 1920.

Little is known of Amiral Tréhouart's career other than she served as a submarine tender during World War I.
