= French ironclad Amiral Tréhouart =

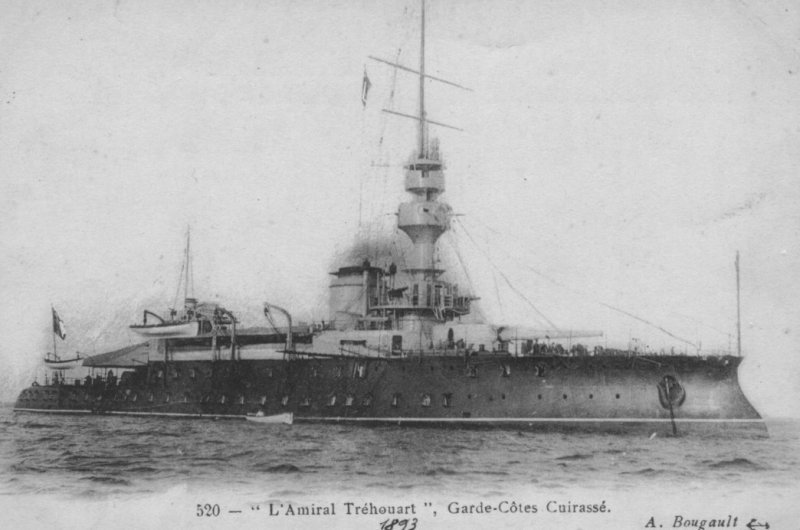
- A postcard of Amiral Tréhouart

History

France
- Name: Amiral Tréhouart
- Namesake: François Thomas Tréhouart
- Builder: Arsenal de Lorient
- Laid down: 20 October 1890
- Launched: 16 May 1893
- Completed: 29 June 1896
- Renamed: From Tréhouart, 25 March 1895
- Fate: Sold for scrap, 4 June 1920

General characteristics (as built)
- Type: Coastal-defense ship
- Displacement: 6,798 t (6,691 long tons)
- Length: 89.65 m (294 ft 2 in) (o/a)
- Beam: 17.86 m (58 ft 7 in)
- Draft: 7.54 m (24.7 ft)
- Installed power: 16 Belleville boilers; 8,865 ihp (6,611 kW)
- Propulsion: 2 shafts, 2 triple-expansion steam engines
- Speed: 16 knots (30 km/h; 18 mph) (at trials)
- Range: 3,900 nautical miles (7,200 km; 4,500 mi) at 8 knots (15 km/h; 9.2 mph)
- Complement: 333 (371 as flagship)
- Armament: 2 × single 305 mm (12 in) guns; 8 × single 100 mm (3.9 in) guns; 4 × single 47 mm (1.9 in) guns; 10 × single 37 mm (1.5 in) guns; 2 × 450 mm (17.7 in) torpedo tubes
- Armor: Belt: 250–464 mm (9.8–18.3 in); Decks: 92 mm (3.6 in); Conning tower: 80 mm (3.1 in); Turrets: 320 mm (12.6 in)

Amiral Tréhouart was the second and last Bouvines-class ironclad coast-defence ships built for the French Navy (Marine Navale) in the early 1890s. Completed in 1896, little is known about her service. During World War I, the ship served as a submarine tender. She was sold for scrap in 1920.

== Design and description ==
The Bouvines-class coast-defence ships were ordered in accordance with the Jeune École's belief in the primacy of coastal defences and commerce raiding. The ships were 89.38 m (293 ft 3 in) long at the waterline and 89.65 m (294 ft 2 in) long overall. They had a beam of 17.86 m (58 ft 7 in) and a draft of 6.38 m (20 ft 11 in) forward and 7.54 m (24 ft 9 in) aft. They displaced 6,798 metric tons (6,691 long tons). Once in service they proved to roll badly so bilge keels were later fitted. The crew of the Bouvines class numbered 15 officers and 318 ratings; service as a flagship added 5 more officers and 33 more ratings.

The Bouvines-class ships were powered by two inclined horizontal triple-expansion steam engines, each driving one propeller shaft. Amiral Tréhouart's engines used steam provided by 16 Belleville boilers that exhausted through a single funnel. The engines produced a total of 8,865 indicated horsepower (6,611 kW) and gave a top speed of 16.05 knots (29.72 km/h; 18.47 mph) on trials. The ships carried enough coal to give them a range of 3,900 nautical miles (7,200 km; 4,500 mi) at a speed of 8 knots (15 km/h; 9.2 mph).

=== Armament and armor ===
The Bouvines-class ships carried their main battery of two Canon de 305 mm (12 in) Modèle 1887 guns in two single-gun turrets, one each fore and aft of the superstructure. Their secondary armament consisted of eight Canon de 100 mm (3.9 in) Modèle 1892 guns, four of which were mounted in individual casemates. The other four were carried on pivot mounts with gun shields on the shelter deck directly above the four casemated guns on the corners of the superstructure.

Initially four Canon de 47 mm (1.9 in) Modèle 1885 Hotchkiss guns were carried for defence from torpedo boats in the fighting top in the military mast, but this was later increased to eight, with the new guns on the superstructure. Initially ten 37-millimetre (1.5 in) Hotchkiss revolving cannon were positioned on the superstructure, but this was reduced to three when the additional 47 mm guns were added. Two 450-millimetre (17.7 in) torpedo tubes were mounted above the waterline, but they were removed in 1906.

The Bouvines class had a full-length waterline armor belt of steel that tapered from the maximum thickness of 464 mm (18.3 in) amidships to 250 mm (9.8 in) at the ship's ends. The ships were intended to have 40 centimetres (15.7 in) of the belt showing above the waterline, but they were overweight as completed and only 24 centimetres (9.4 in) of the belt was above the waterline. The maximum thickness of the armored deck was 92 mm (3.6 in) and it was joined to the top of the armor belt. The main turret armor was 370 mm (14.6 in) thick although the barbettes were only 320 mm (12.6 in) thick. The plates protecting the conning tower measured 80 mm (3.1 in) in thickness.

== Construction and career ==
Amiral Tréhouart, named for Admiral François Thomas Tréhouart, was authorized in the 1889 Naval Programme and was ordered from Arsenal de Lorient. The ship was laid down on 20 October 1890 under the name of Tréhouart and launched on 16 May 1893. She was given her final name on 25 March 1895 and was completed on 29 June 1896.

In 1914 Amiral Tréhouart became a submarine depot ship. She was sold for scrap on 4 July 1920, but was not broken up until 1922.
