= French cruiser Davout =

Protected cruiser of the French Navy

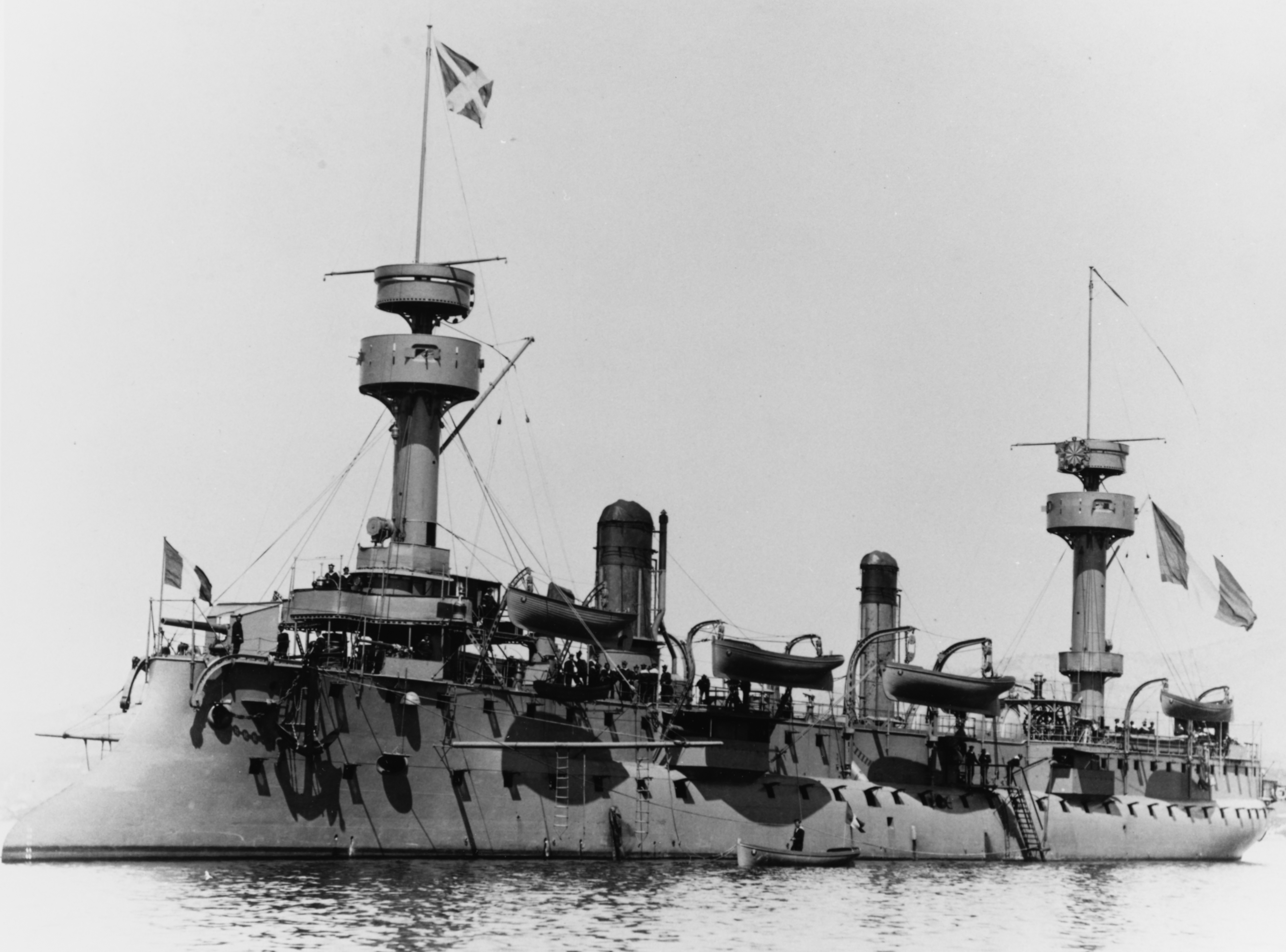
- Davout early in her career

Class overview
- Preceded by: Amiral Cécille
- Succeeded by: Suchet

History

France
- Name: Davout
- Ordered: 1 March 1887
- Laid down: 12 September 1887
- Launched: 31 October 1889
- Commissioned: 20 October 1890
- Decommissioned: 1 May 1909
- Stricken: 9 March 1910
- Fate: Broken up, 1913

General characteristics
- Type: Protected cruiser
- Displacement: 3,330 t (3,280 long tons; 3,670 short tons)
- Length: 91.25 m (299 ft 5 in) loa
- Beam: 11.62 m (38 ft 1 in)
- Draft: 4.65 m (15 ft 3 in)
- Installed power: 8 × fire-tube boilers; 9,000 ihp (6,700 kW)
- Propulsion: 2 × triple-expansion steam engines; 2 × screw propellers
- Speed: 20.7 knots (38.3 km/h; 23.8 mph)
- Complement: 329
- Armament: 6 × 164 mm (6.5 in) guns; 4 × 65 mm (2.6 in) 9-pounder guns; 4 × 47 mm (1.9 in) Hotchkiss guns; 2 × 37 mm (1.5 in) guns; 6 × 350 mm (13.8 in) torpedo tubes
- Armor: Deck: 51 to 102 mm (2 to 4 in); Conning tower: 71 mm (2.8 in)

Davout was a protected cruiser of the French Navy that was built in the late 1880s and early 1890s. The ship was ordered during the tenure of Admiral Théophile Aube as the French Minister of Marine, who favored a fleet centered on large numbers of cruisers of various types. Davout and the similar vessel Suchet were ordered to fill the role of a medium cruiser in Aube's plans. Davout was armed with a main battery of six 164 mm (6.5 in) guns in single mounts, and she had a top speed of 20.7 knots (38.3 km/h; 23.8 mph).

Davout had a relatively uneventful career; her completion was delayed by two years due to problems with her propulsion system. After entering service in 1893, she was assigned to the Reserve Squadron, based in the Mediterranean Sea. The ship spent the rest of the decade operating either with the Reserve Squadron for training exercises or as part of the training unit of the French fleet. In 1899, she received a major overhaul that included the installation of new boilers, and in 1902, she was assigned to the North Atlantic Station. By 1910, she had been struck from the naval register, and Davout was subsequently sold to ship breakers.

== Design ==
Davout was designed during the tenure of Admiral Théophile Aube, who had become the French Minister of Marine in 1886, though the ship traces its origin to design specifications issued by Aube's predecessor, Charles-Eugène Galiber, in December 1885. Galiber requested a ship of 2,600 t (2,600 long tons; 2,900 short tons) with a speed of 18 knots (33 km/h; 21 mph) with forced draft. Aube, who replaced Galiber in January 1886, was an ardent supporter of the Jeune École doctrine, which envisioned using a combination of cruisers and torpedo boats to defend France and attack enemy merchant shipping.

By the time Aube had come to office, the French Navy had laid down three large protected cruisers that were intended to serve as commerce raiders: Sfax, Tage, and Amiral Cécille. His proposed budget called for another six large cruisers and ten smaller vessels. By this time, a total of eleven designs were submitted to be evaluated by the Conseil des Travaux (Council of Works), and that prepared by Marie de Bussy was selected. The required speed had by that time been increased to 20 knots (37 km/h; 23 mph); the naval historian Stephen Roberts states that Aube was probably responsible for the change. Aube ordered three ships to the design on 1 March 1887: Davout, Suchet, and Chanzy, though the contracts were not finalized by the time Aube left the ministry, being replaced by Édouard Barbey.

On reviewing Aube's plans and the French naval budget, Barbey decided that the proposed cruiser program would have to be reduced. In May 1887, when the budget was approved, the plan was modified to three large cruisers: the Alger class; six small cruisers: the Forbin and Troude classes; and two medium ships. Chanzy was cancelled and Davout and Suchet filled the requirement for the two medium ships. These ships were to serve as prototypes for the later Friant class. During work on Suchet the supervisor at Toulon decided alterations needed to be made, so only Davout was completed to the original design. And after it became clear that the propulsion system for Davout would not meet the intended speed. These engines in turn necessitated increases in displacement and the Friant-class ships were re-designed to accommodate the changes.

=== General characteristics and machinery ===
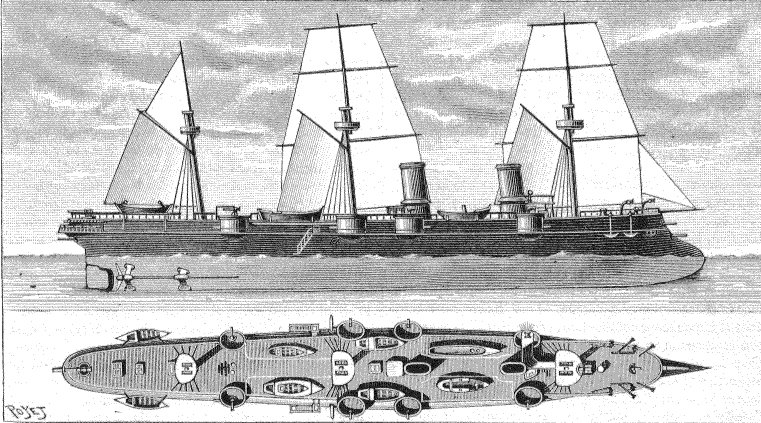
Sketch of Davout from 1890, incorrectly showing her with a sailing rig

Davout was 91.25 m (299 ft 5 in) long overall, with a beam of 11.62 m (38 ft 1 in) and an average draft of 4.65 m (15 ft 3 in), which increased to 6 m (19 ft 8 in) aft. She displaced 3,330 t (3,280 long tons; 3,670 short tons). Her hull featured a pronounced ram bow, an overhanging stern, and a flush deck. The bow was not actually strengthened to permit ramming attacks. As was typical for French warships of the period, she had a pronounced tumblehome shape. Her superstructure was minimal, consisting primarily of a small bridge forward and a pair of heavy military masts with fighting tops that housed some of her light guns. Her crew consisted of 323 officers and enlisted men.

The propulsion system for Davout consisted of two inverted, 3-cylinder triple-expansion steam engines that drove a pair of screw propellers. Steam was provided by eight coal-fired fire-tube boilers that were ducted into two widely spaced funnels located amidships. The power plant was rated to produce 8,950 indicated horsepower (6,670 kW) for a top speed of 20 knots (37 km/h; 23 mph). On her initial speed trials, she reached 9,039 ihp (6,740 kW) for a speed of 20.07 knots (37.17 km/h; 23.10 mph). Coal storage amounted to 477 t (469 long tons; 526 short tons) normally and up to 534 t (526 long tons; 589 short tons) at full load. The ship had a cruising radius of 7,130 nautical miles (13,200 km; 8,210 mi) at the economical speed of 10 knots (19 km/h; 12 mph). The ship's propulsion system proved to be unreliable in service. Neither the boilers or their uptakes could be cleaned while the ship was steaming, so speed could not be kept up after a few days of operation, rendering her unreliable on long-distance cruises. Davout was the first French protected cruiser to discard a sailing rig.

=== Armament and armor ===
Davout was armed with a main battery of six 164.7 mm (6.48 in) M1884 30-caliber (cal.) guns carried in individual pivot mounts. Four of the guns were mounted in sponsons on the upper deck, two on each broadside. One gun was placed in the bow and the other was at the stern as chase guns. For close-range defense against torpedo boats, she carried four 65 mm (2.6 in) M1888 9-pounder guns, four 47 mm (1.9 in) M1885 40-cal. 3-pounder Hotchkiss guns, and eight 37 mm (1.5 in) M1885 20-cal. 1-pounder guns, all in individual mounts. She also carried six 350 mm (13.8 in) torpedo tubes in her hull above the waterline. Two were in the bow, one was on each broadside, and the remaining two were in the stern.

The ship was protected by an armor deck that consisted of mild steel. The deck was 82 mm (3.2 in) thick on the flat portion that covered her propulsion machinery spaces and magazines; for the rest of the hull's length, the deck was reduced significantly to 30 mm (1.2 in). Toward the sides of the ship, the deck sloped down with a uniform thickness of 80 mm (3.1 in). The entire deck, both the flat and sloped sections, were layered on 20 mm (0.79 in) of hull plating. The flat section of the deck was 0.51 m (1 ft 8 in) above the waterline and the sloped sides met the hull plating 1.09 m (3 ft 7 in) below the line. Above the deck, a cofferdam was placed to contain shell fragments and control flooding in the event of damage. Her main battery guns were fitted with 4 mm (0.16 in) gun shields to deflect shell fragments.

=== Modifications ===
Davout underwent a major refit in stages between 1894 and 1896. In 1894, the main battery guns were replaced with quick-firing versions. The following year, an armored conning tower, with 40 mm (1.6 in) thick sides, and a communication tube extending down into the ship were installed, and the 4 mm gun shields were replaced with more effective 54 mm (2.1 in) shields. The heavy military masts were replaced with lighter pole masts to save weight, and the four 37 mm guns that had been mounted in the fighting tops were removed. The stern torpedo tubes were also removed.

In 1900, the ship underwent a second modification, which included the removal of her bow torpedo tubes and the remaining four 37 mm guns. She also received ten new Niclausse boilers, which necessitated the addition of a third funnel. The boilers were divided between three boiler rooms, the first of which held two boilers and the remaining rooms each holding four.

== Service history ==
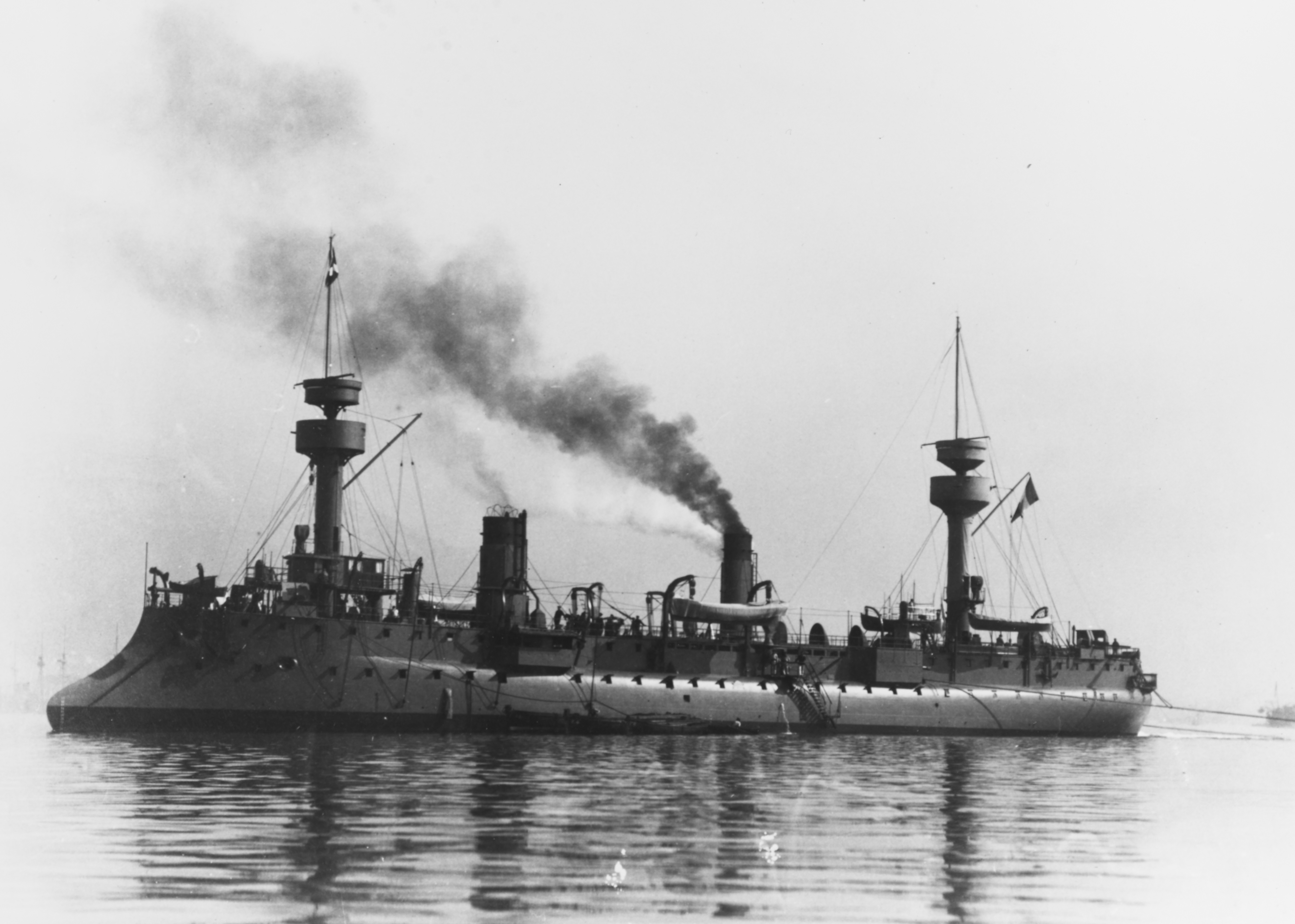
Davout shortly before her completion

Davout was ordered on 1 March 1887, and she was built in Toulon, France; her keel laying took place on 12 September 1887 and she was launched on 31 October 1889. She was commissioned on 20 October 1890 to begin sea trials, but these were delayed after problems with her propulsion system required multiple repairs and alterations, including the brazing of her boiler tubes, which had to be redone. The pistons in her engines also had to be replaced. The ship finally completed in 1892, and she was placed in full commission on 20 September. At that time, she joined the Mediterranean Squadron, which was based in Toulon. The following year, Davout was transferred to the Reserve Squadron, where she spent six months of the year on active service with full crews for maneuvers; the rest of the year was spent laid up with a reduced crew. At that time, the unit also included several older ironclads and the cruisers Tage, Sfax, Forbin, and Condor.

While in the Reserve Squadron in 1894, the ship had her main guns updated during a refit carried out at Rochefort. The work was ordered on 20 March, began on 21 July, and was completed on 20 February 1895. She took part in the fleet maneuvers that year, which began on 1 July and concluded on the 27th. She was assigned to "Fleet B", which along with "Fleet A" represented the French fleet, and was tasked with defeating the hostile "Fleet C", which represented the Italian fleet. She thereafter returned to the shipyard at Rochefort for another period of refits. Her active career was limited, and by 1896, she was reduced to the 2nd category of reserve, along with several old coastal defense ships, ironclads, and other cruisers. They were retained in a state that allowed them to be mobilized in the event of a major war.

She was withdrawn from service for a lengthy reconstruction in 1897 that included the installation of Niclausse-type water-tube boilers. The project was deferred, and in 1898, Davout was assigned to the training squadron, along with the armored cruiser Amiral Charner and the protected cruiser Friant. She had been reduced to the reserve fleet by January 1899, but Davout was recommissioned on 1 April that year and assigned to the training squadron. She continued to operate in the training squadron with Amiral Charner and Friant. The squadron steamed to Brest in late September that year to be dispersed and deactivated for the winter; Davout was sent to the naval base at Rochefort to be laid up on 1 October. The planned re-boilering was finally carried out between August and December 1900.

The ship was reactivated in 1902 to replace the cruiser Suchet on the North Atlantic station. At some point later in her career, two of her torpedo tubes were removed, and later again, another pair were removed. The ship was decommissioned on 1 May 1909 and was later assigned to serve as a training ship for boiler room crews on 27 May, to be based at Brest. She was towed there on 16 August and anchored in Landévennec, outside of Brest. She remained there for a short time before being struck from the naval register on 9 March 1910, though she was not sold to ship breakers until 23 October 1913. She was thereafter broken up in Brest.
