= French ironclad Bouvines =

Ironclad ship of the French Navy

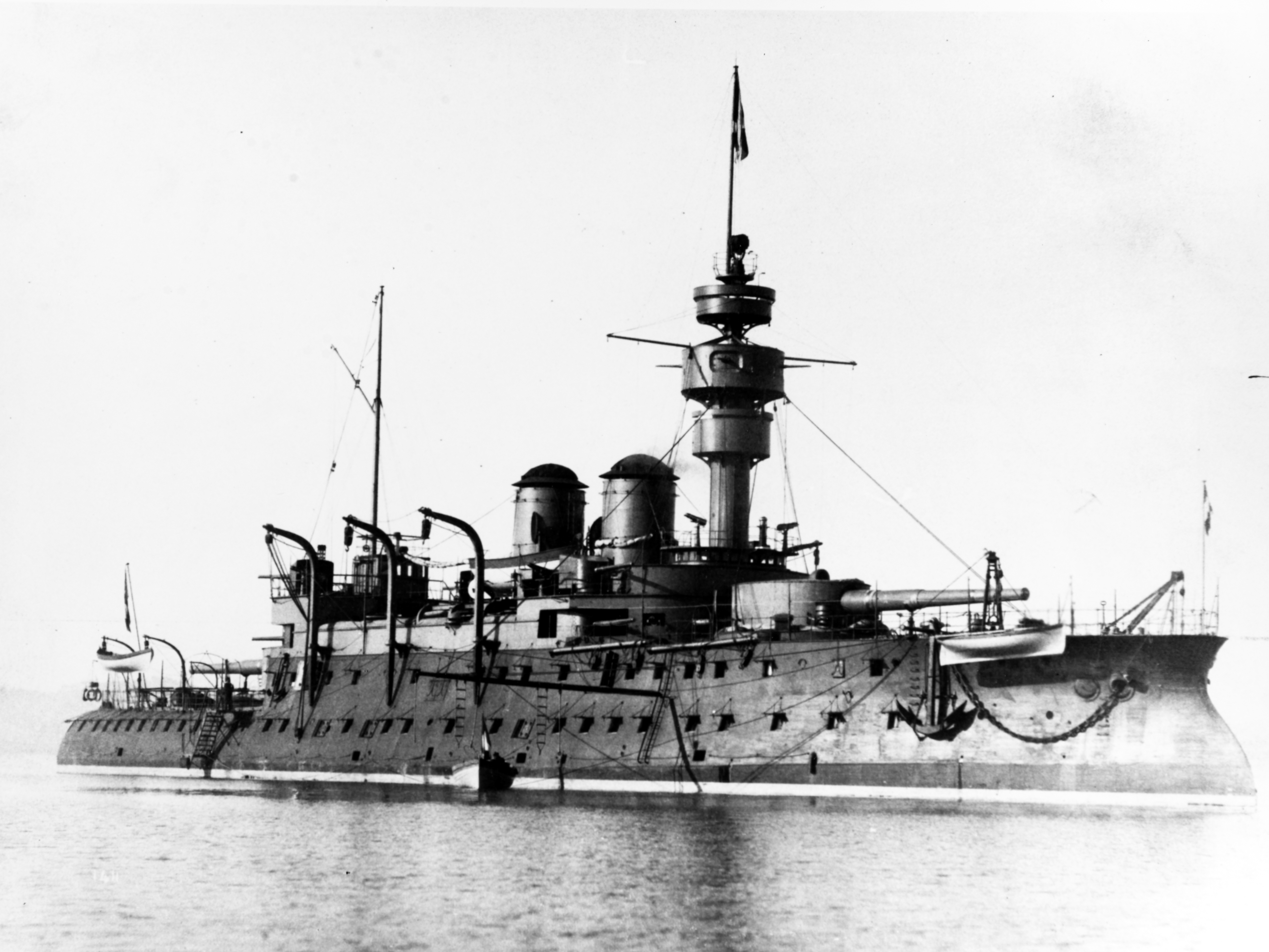
- Bouvines in early 1895

History

France
- Name: Bouvines
- Namesake: Battle of Bouvines
- Ordered: 18 December 1889
- Builder: Forges et Chantiers de la Méditerranée, La Seyne-sur-Mer
- Cost: FF14,986,587
- Laid down: 30 September 1890
- Launched: 29 March 1892
- Completed: 1 December 1895
- Stricken: 8 June 1918
- Fate: Sold for scrap, 19 June 1920

General characteristics (as built)
- Type: Coastal-defense ship
- Displacement: 6,798 t (6,691 long tons)
- Length: 89.65 m (294 ft 2 in) (o/a)
- Beam: 17.86 m (58 ft 7 in)
- Draft: 7.54 m (24.7 ft)
- Installed power: 16 water-tube boilers; 8,865 ihp (6,611 kW)
- Propulsion: 2 shafts, 2 triple-expansion steam engines
- Speed: 16 knots (30 km/h; 18 mph) (at trials)
- Range: 3,900 nautical miles (7,200 km; 4,500 mi) at 8 knots (15 km/h; 9.2 mph)
- Complement: 333 (371 as flagship)
- Armament: 2 × single 305 mm (12 in) guns; 8 × single 100 mm (3.9 in) guns; 4 × single 47 mm (1.9 in) guns; 10 × single 37 mm (1.5 in) guns; 2 × 450 mm (17.7 in) torpedo tubes
- Armor: Belt: 250–464 mm (9.8–18.3 in); Decks: 92 mm (3.6 in); Conning tower: 80 mm (3.1 in); Turrets: 320 mm (12.6 in)

Bouvines was the lead ship for her class of two ironclad coast-defence ships built for the French Navy (Marine Nationale) in the early 1890s. Completed in 1895, she always served as a flagship and was initially assigned to the Northern Squadron (Escadre du Nord). The ship was briefly reduced to reserve in 1898, but was reactivated later that year as part of the Mediterranean Squadron (Escadre de Méditerranée). Three years later, Bouvines rejoined the Northern Squadron.

The ship was again placed in reserve in 1907, but was recommissioned in 1910 as flagship for the units assigned to the English Channel. Later that year she badly damaged a French destroyer in a collision at night while training. Bouvines returned to reserve status in 1912, but she was decommissioned the following year. Despite this, the ship served as a guard ship during World War I. Bouvines was condemned in mid-1918 and was sold for scrap in 1920.

== Design and description ==
The Bouvines-class coast-defence ships were ordered in accordance with the Jeune École's belief in the primacy of coastal defences and commerce raiding. The ships were 89.38 m (293 ft 3 in) long at the waterline and 89.65 m (294 ft 2 in) long overall. They had a beam of 17.86 m (58 ft 7 in) and a draft of 6.38 m (20 ft 11 in) forward and 7.54 m (24 ft 9 in) aft. They displaced 6,798 metric tons (6,691 long tons). Once in service they proved to roll badly so bilge keels were later fitted. The crew of the Bouvines class numbered 15 officers and 318 ratings; service as a flagship added 5 more officers and 33 more ratings.

The Bouvines-class ships were powered by two inclined horizontal triple-expansion steam engines, each driving a 4.5-metre (15 ft) propeller. Bouvines's engines used steam provided by 16 (Note: Stourton says 18 boilers.) d'Allest-Lagrafel water-tube boilers at a working pressure of 15 kg/cm^{2} (1,471 kPa; 213 psi) that exhausted through two funnels. The engines produced a total of 8,865 indicated horsepower (6,611 kW) and gave a top speed of 16.05 knots (29.72 km/h; 18.47 mph) on trials. The ships carried enough coal to give them a range of 3,900 nautical miles (7,200 km; 4,500 mi) at a speed of 8 knots (15 km/h; 9.2 mph).

=== Armament and armor ===
The Bouvines-class ships carried their main battery of two Canon de 305 mm (12 in) Modèle 1887 guns in two single-gun turrets, one each fore and aft of the superstructure. Their secondary armament consisted of eight Canon de 100 mm (3.9 in) Modèle 1892 guns, four of which were mounted in individual casemates. The other four were carried on pivot mounts with gun shields on the shelter deck directly above the four casemated guns on the corners of the superstructure.

Initially four Canon de 47 mm (1.9 in) Modèle 1885 Hotchkiss guns were carried for defence from torpedo boats in the fighting top in the military mast, but this was later increased to eight, with the new guns on the superstructure. Initially ten 37-millimetre (1.5 in) Hotchkiss revolving cannon were positioned on the superstructure, but this was reduced to three when the additional 47 mm guns were added. Two 450-millimetre (17.7 in) torpedo tubes were mounted above the waterline, but they were removed in 1906.

The Bouvines class had a full-length waterline armor belt of steel that tapered from the maximum thickness of 464 mm (18.3 in) amidships to 250 mm (9.8 in) at the ships' ends. They were intended to have 40 centimetres (15.7 in) of the belt showing above the waterline, but they were overweight as completed and only 24 centimetres (9.4 in) of the belt was above the waterline. The maximum thickness of the armored deck was 92 mm (3.6 in) and it was joined to the top of the armor belt. The main turret armor was 370 mm (14.6 in) thick although the barbettes were only 320 mm (12.6 in) thick. The plates protecting the conning tower measured 80 mm (3.1 in) in thickness.

== Construction and career ==
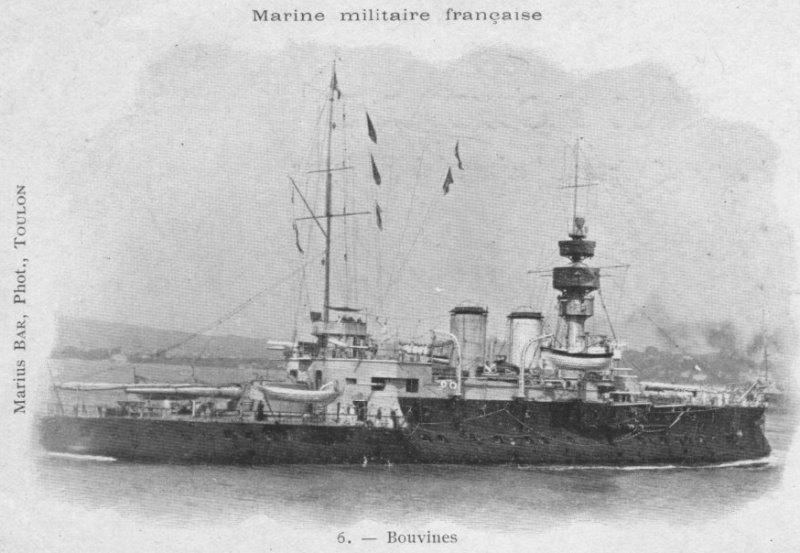
A postcard of Bouvines

Bouvines, named for the 1214 Battle of Bouvines, was authorized in the 1889 Supplementary Naval Programme and was ordered from Forges et Chantiers de la Méditerranée on 18 December 1889. The ship was laid down on 30 September 1890 at their La Seyne-sur-Mer shipyard and launched on 29 March 1892. She was commissioned for preliminary trials on 15 October 1894, but excessive heating in her boiler rooms and funnels took some time to rectify and official trials did not begin until mid-1895. A premature detonation of a 47 mm shell during gunnery tests on 23 July killed two men and wounded two others, including Rear Admiral Chateauminois, President of the Trials Commission. Bouvines was fully commissioned (armée definitif) on 1 December. Her construction cost 14,986,587 francs.

The ship arrived at Brest on 22 January 1896 and briefly became the flagship of Rear Admiral Ménard, commander of the Second Battleship Division (2^{e} division cuirassée) of the Northern Squadron, on 1 February. Ménard was replaced eight days later by Rear Admiral Charles-Félix-Edgard de Courthille. Bouvines had engine problems shortly afterwards and conducted trials on the 22nd. For the next year and a half, she spent her time at sea training in the English Channel and Bay of Biscay, interrupted only by ferrying the President of France, Félix Faure, from Saint-Nazaire to Rochefort on 22 April 1897. De Courthille was relieved by Rear Admiral Auguste Éléonor de Penfentenyo de Kervéréguen on 10 October 1898 and transferred his flag to another ship when Bouvines was ordered to proceed to Toulon to be placed in reserve on 26 September.

The ship was recommissioned on 15 December and became the flagship of Rear Admiral Léonce Caillard, commander of the Coast-Defence Division (Division des garde-côtes) of the Mediterranean Squadron. She conducted routine exercises off the coast of Provence in 1899 and Caillard was replaced by Rear Admiral Escande on 15 July, but he was relieved in his turn by Rear Admiral Charles-Alfred Mallarmé on 1 September. Bouvines departed Toulon on 21 June 1900 together with the rest of the Mediterranean Squadron to participate in manoeuvres with the Northern Squadron in the Channel and the Bay of Biscay. From 22 July the division was attached to the Northern Squadron and based in Cherbourg with reduced crews.

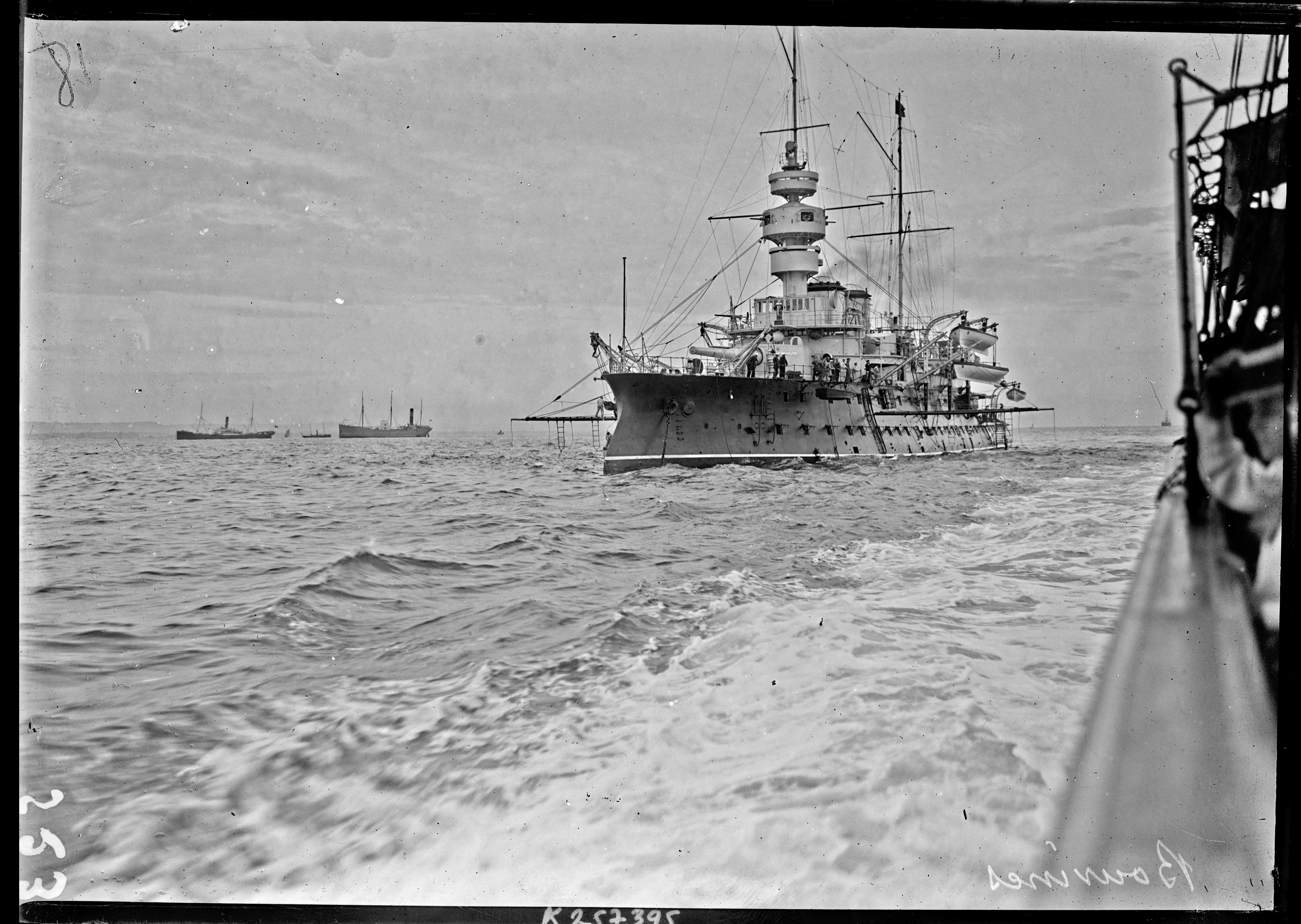
Bouvines in 1905

The crews were filled out to full strength in preparation for the following year's manoeuvres and gunnery exercises in the Mediterranean. The Northern Squadron departed Cherbourg on 20 June 1901 and returned on 13 August. Bouvines rejoined the 2nd Battleship Division on 1 September as the flagship of Rear Admiral Rouvier. The division was transferred to Brest in 1902 and then joined the rest of the Squadron for the annual manoeuvres in the Mediterranean on 30 June. The ship made port visits in Lisbon, Portugal, and French North Africa between exercises before returning to Cherbourg on 4 September. Over the next three years, she trained in the Channel and the Bay of Biscay. Rouvier was relieved by Rear Admiral François Leygue on 28 March 1904; Rear Admiral Joseph-Albert Philibert replaced him on 3 April 1906. The Northern Squadron joined with the Mediterranean Squadron for combined manoeuvres in the Eastern Mediterranean in mid-1906 and returned to Brest after the customary port visits on 28 August. The division arrived at Cherbourg on 5 October and Bouvines was reduced to reserve there on 1 January 1907.

The ship was reactivated on 13 April 1910 as the flagship for the commander of the Channel Flotillas (Commandeur supérieur des flotilles de la Manche). She was sent to Calais to assist with the salvage of the wreck of the submarine Pluviôse on 28 May. While conducting night training on 13 September, Bouvines collided with, and badly damaged, the destroyer Escopette. She was returned to reserve at Cherbourg on 1 June 1912 and was decommissioned on 1 July 1913. Bouvines was reactivated on 1 August 1914, just a few days before the French declaration of war on Imperial Germany. She served as the guard ship for Cherbourg until 1917. The ship was condemned and stricken from the navy list on 8 June 1918. Her hulk was sold for FF550,000 on 19 June 1920.
