= French cruiser Suchet =

Protected cruiser of the French Navy

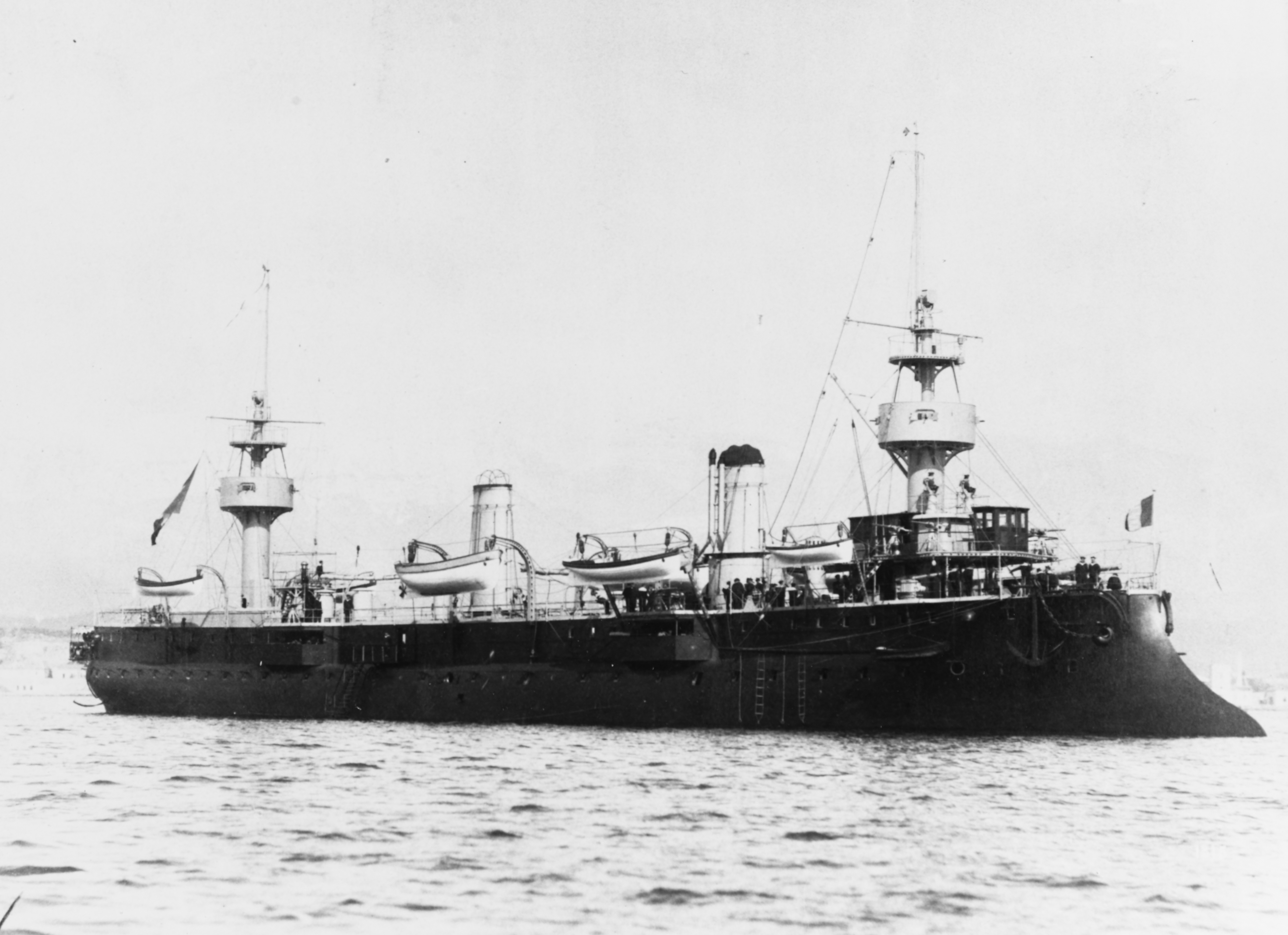
- Suchet in Toulon early in her career

Class overview
- Preceded by: Davout
- Succeeded by: Forbin class

History

France
- Name: Suchet
- Ordered: 1 March 1887
- Laid down: 1 October 1887
- Launched: 10 August 1893
- Commissioned: 1 January 1894
- Decommissioned: 11 November 1905
- Stricken: 24 April 1906
- Fate: Broken up, 1927

General characteristics
- Type: Protected cruiser
- Displacement: 3,440 t (3,390 long tons; 3,790 short tons)
- Length: 98.95 m (324 ft 8 in) loa
- Beam: 12.12 m (39 ft 9 in)
- Draft: 5.35 m (18 ft)
- Installed power: 24 × fire-tube boilers; 9,500 ihp (7,100 kW)
- Propulsion: 2 × triple-expansion steam engines; 2 × screw propellers
- Speed: 20 knots (37 km/h; 23 mph)
- Complement: 335
- Armament: 6 × 164.7 mm (6.48 in) guns; 4 × 100 mm (3.9 in) guns; 8 × 47 mm (1.9 in) Hotchkiss guns; 8 × 37 mm (1.5 in) guns; 7 × 356 mm (14 in) torpedo tubes
- Armor: Deck: 30 to 82 mm (1.2 to 3.2 in); Conning tower: 40 mm (1.6 in); Gun shields: 54 mm (2.1 in)

Suchet was a protected cruiser of the French Navy built in the late 1880s and early 1890s. The ship was ordered during the tenure of Admiral Théophile Aube as the French Minister of Marine, who favored a fleet centered on large numbers of cruisers of various types. Suchet and the similar vessel Davout were ordered to fill the role of a medium cruiser in Aube's plans; the two cruisers were meant to be identical, but problems during Davout's construction forced design changes to Suchet, resulting in two unique vessels rather than a single class. Suchet was armed with a main battery of six 164 mm (6.5 in) guns in individual mounts and had a top speed of 20.4 knots (37.8 km/h; 23.5 mph).

After completing her sea trials in 1894, Suchet was assigned to the Mediterranean Squadron the next year. She took part in the opening ceremonies for the Bizerte Canal later that year. She continued to operate with the unit through early 1897, when she was sent to the Levant Division in the eastern Mediterranean. The ship was reassigned to the Naval Division of the Atlantic Ocean in 1900, and she was one of the first responders to the 1902 eruption of Mount Pelée in May, helping to rescue survivors from Saint-Pierre and its harbor, along with other towns on the island of Martinique. In total, she evacuated around 1,200 people to Fort-de-France. The next month, she was involved in a minor diplomatic incident with Venezuela, where six Frenchmen had been arrested; Suchet's intervention secured their release. The ship returned to France later in 1902, where she was placed in reserve. Struck from the naval register in 1906, Suchet was broken up for scrap.

== Design ==
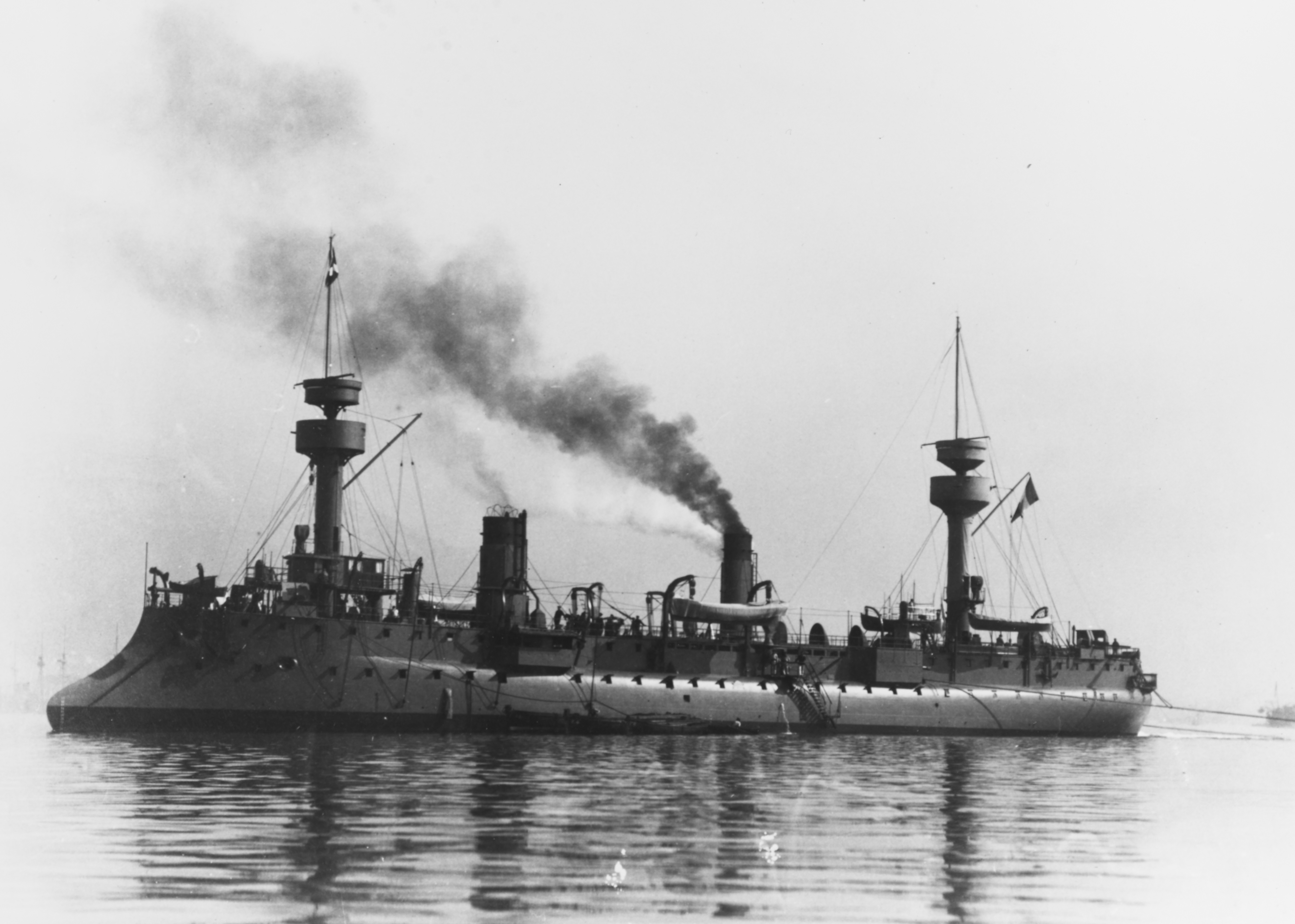
Davout; Suchet began as a direct sister ship to this cruiser

Suchet was originally intended to be a sister ship to the protected cruiser Davout, which was designed during the tenure of Admiral Théophile Aube, who had become the French Minister of Marine in 1886. The ships trace their origin to design specifications issued by Aube's predecessor, Charles-Eugène Galiber, in December 1885. Galiber requested a ship of 2,600 t (2,559 long tons; 2,866 short tons) with a speed of 18 knots (33 km/h; 21 mph) with forced draft. Aube, who replaced Galiber in January 1886, was an ardent supporter of the Jeune École doctrine, which envisioned using a combination of cruisers and torpedo boats to defend France and attack enemy merchant shipping.

By the time Aube had come to office, the French Navy had laid down three large protected cruisers that were intended to serve as commerce raiders: Sfax, Tage, and Amiral Cécille. His proposed budget called for another six large cruisers and ten smaller vessels. By this time, a total of eleven designs were submitted to be evaluated by the Conseil des Travaux (Council of Works), and that prepared by Marie de Bussy was selected. The required speed had by that time been increased to 20 knots (37 km/h; 23 mph); the naval historian Stephen Roberts states that Aube was probably responsible for the change. Aube ordered three ships to the design on 1 March 1887: Suchet, Davout, and Chanzy, though the contracts were not finalized by the time Aube left the ministry, being replaced by Édouard Barbey.

On reviewing Aube's plans and the French naval budget, Barbey decided that the proposed cruiser program would have to be reduced. In May 1887, when the budget was approved, the plan was modified to three large cruisers: the Alger class; six small cruisers: the Forbin and Troude classes; and two medium ships. Chanzy was cancelled and Suchet and Davout filled the requirement for the two medium ships. During construction of Suchet at Toulon, a number of changes were made to the original design, beginning with the addition of a torpedo tube to the bow, which was approved on 28 March 1887. As work continued, Delphin Albert Lhomme, the supervisor of construction at the shipyard, decided that the ship's engine room lacked sufficient ventilation and did not permit easy maintenance of the propulsion system. Lhomme therefore ordered work to stop on 20 March 1888 to allow him time to prepare alterations to correct the deficiencies.

Lhomme completed the new design in 1890, which he submitted to Barbey on 16 August. He proposed lengthening the hull by 7 m (23 ft); the additional space would be used to enlarge the engine room by 2.16 m (7 ft 1 in), with the remainder to be used as a fourth boiler room with two more fire-tube boilers. On 13 September, Barbey approved the proposal, which allowed work to resume four days later. To accommodate for the lengthened hull, some of the superstructure was rearranged slightly and the forecastle was extended by 1.2 m (3 ft 11 in). Further changes were made once construction resumed; after experience with Davout showed that the heavy military masts hampered stability, Suchet's masts were shortened to reduce weight high in the ship. The four 65 mm (2.6 in) anti-torpedo boat guns mounted aboard Davout were replaced with 100 mm (3.9 in) guns for Suchet, and on 28 January 1893, a new quick-firing version of the 164.7 mm (6.48 in) main battery guns were ordered to be installed instead of the original slow-firing guns that had been allocated to the ship.

=== General characteristics and machinery ===
Suchet early in her career

Suchet was 95 m (311 ft 8 in) long between perpendiculars, 97.7 m (320 ft 6 in) long at the waterline, and 98.95 m (324 ft 8 in) long overall. She had a beam of 12.12 m (39 ft 9 in) and an average draft of 5.35 m (18 ft), which increased to 5.9 m (19 ft 4 in) aft. She had a designed displacement of 3,440 t (3,390 long tons; 3,790 short tons). Her hull featured a pronounced ram bow, an overhanging stern, and a flush deck. The bow could not actually be used for ramming attacks, in part due to the presence of the bow torpedo tube. As was typical for French warships of the period, she had a pronounced tumblehome shape. Her superstructure was minimal, consisting primarily of a small conning tower forward and a pair of heavy military masts with fighting tops that housed some of her light guns. Her crew consisted of 335 officers and enlisted men.

The propulsion system for Suchet consisted of two horizontal triple-expansion steam engines that drove a pair of screw propellers. Steam was provided by twenty-four coal-fired fire-tube boilers that were ducted into two widely spaced funnels located amidships. The power plant was rated to produce 9,500 indicated horsepower (7,100 kW) for a top speed of 20 knots. During speed tests in 1894, the ship reached 9,504 ihp (7,087 kW) for a speed of 20.41 knots (37.80 km/h; 23.49 mph). Coal storage amounted to 529 t (521 long tons; 583 short tons) normally and up to 663 t (653 long tons; 731 short tons). Like Davout, the ship's propulsion system proved to be unreliable in service. Neither the boilers or their uptakes could be cleaned while the ship was steaming, so speed could not be kept up after a few days of operation, rendering her unreliable on long-distance cruises. During voyages overseas, she could only steam at a speed of 13 or 14 knots (24 or 26 km/h; 15 or 16 mph), which allowed her crew to alternate sets of boilers so they could clean half of them at a time.

=== Armament and armor ===
Suchet was armed with a main battery of six 164 mm (6.5 in) M1884 30-caliber (cal.) guns carried in individual pivot mounts. Four of the guns were mounted in sponsons on the upper deck, two on each broadside. One gun was placed in the bow and the other was at the stern as chase guns. These were supported by a secondary battery of four 100 mm M1881 26.2-cal. guns, also in individual pivot mounts. These were placed close to the chase guns, two just aft of the bow gun and the other pair directly ahead of the stern gun. For close-range defense against torpedo boats, she carried eight 47 mm (1.9 in) M1885 3-pounder Hotchkiss guns and eight 37 mm (1.5 in) M1884 1-pounder guns, all in individual mounts. In addition, she carried a pair of 65 mm field guns that could be sent ashore with a landing party. She also carried seven 356 mm (14 in) torpedo tubes in her hull, six above the waterline and the last submerged. The submerged tube was placed in the bow, two were further aft in the bow, two on each broadside, and the remaining pair were in the stern.

The ship was protected by an armor deck that consisted of mild steel. Amidships, the deck was 82 mm (3.2 in) thick on the flat portion over most of the width of the hull, where it covered her propulsion machinery spaces and magazines. Forward and aft, the deck was reduced in thickness to 30 mm (1.2 in). Toward the sides of the ship, the deck sloped down to provide a measure of side protection; the sloped side was 80 mm (3.1 in) thick. All areas of the deck were layered on 20 mm (0.79 in) of hull plating. The machinery spaces received a second layer of protection against shell splinters. Above the armor deck was a closely subdivided cellular layer that was 460 mm (18 in) deep, which was intended to contain flooding by preventing it from penetrating far into the ship. The conning tower had 40 mm (1.6 in) thick sides. Suchet's main battery guns were fitted with 54 mm (2.1 in) gun shields to protect the crews from shell fragments.

=== Modifications ===
Suchet underwent two refits and alterations during her career. In 1896, the stern torpedo tubes were removed to provide space for accommodations for naval cadets. The following year, she began a more substantial refit. Her military masts were replaced with lighter pole masts, the two forward torpedo tubes were removed, and the four 37 mm guns that had been mounted in the fighting tops were removed as well. The ship was slated for a third refit in 1902 that would have seen her fire-tube boilers replaced with new Belleville-type water-tube boilers, but the proposal was cancelled in 1905 after the boilers had already been ordered and delivered from the manufacturer.

== Service history ==
Suchet passing through the Bizerte Canal on 4 June 1895

=== Construction and early career ===
Suchet was ordered on 1 March 1887, and her keel was laid down in Toulon on 1 October. Work on the ship was delayed considerably to address Lhomme's concerns about the ship, work stopping on 10 March 1888 and not resuming until 17 September 1890. Installation of the ship's machinery began on 26 September 1892, and she was launched on 10 August 1893, before the work was completed on 20 November; this was the first time a French government shipyard launched a vessel that far progressed in its construction. She was commissioned to begin sea trials on 1 January 1894, which were carried out between 20 March and 24 April, and during which she reached a speed of 18.2 knots (33.7 km/h; 20.9 mph) under normal conditions and 20.4 knots using forced draft. She was placed in full commission on 13 June, though the results of her trials were not formally approved until 15 September. She was thereafter assigned to the Mediterranean Squadron on 1 October, replacing Davout.

In 1895, she remained in service with the Mediterranean Squadron, serving as part of the cruiser force for France's primary battle fleet. At that time, the fleet consisted of seven ironclads, the cruiser Tage, and the three Troude-class cruisers, among other smaller vessels. In the early 1890s, the French had been working on the Bizerte Canal, which connected the Mediterranean Sea to the Lac de Bizerte; the work was completed in June 1895, and Suchet was among the first vessels to pass through after its opening on 4 June. She took part in the fleet maneuvers that year, which began on 1 July and concluded on the 27th. She was assigned to "Fleet C", which represented the hostile Italian fleet, which was tasked with defeating "Fleet A" and "Fleet B". The latter two units represented the French fleet, and they were individually inferior to "Fleet C", but superior when combined.

In 1896, Suchet was nominally part of the Mediterranean Squadron, but she was used as a training ship for naval cadets. Suchet nevertheless operated with the squadron that year, taking part in that year's maneuvers as part of the cruiser screen for the 2nd Division. The maneuvers for that year took place from 6 to 30 July. She was part of the squadron again in 1897, but later that year she was transferred to the Levant Division to replace the cruiser Bugeaud, which was suffering from engine problems.

=== Atlantic deployment ===
In 1900, Suchet joined the Naval Division of the Atlantic Ocean, which also included the protected cruisers Amiral Cécille, D'Assas, and Troude. She came under the command of Commander Pierre Ange Marie Le Bris that year; over the next two years, Suchet was tasked with protecting French interests in Colombia and Venezuela during domestic unrest in both countries. The flotilla assigned to the Atlantic was reduced to Suchet, Amiral Cécille, and the cruiser D'Estrées in 1901. In late November, Suchet went to Colon, Colombia along with United States and British warships, where they were present during unsuccessful negotiations to bring the Thousand Days' War to an end. She remained on station in the division in 1902, along with D'Estrées, Tage, and the cruiser Descartes.

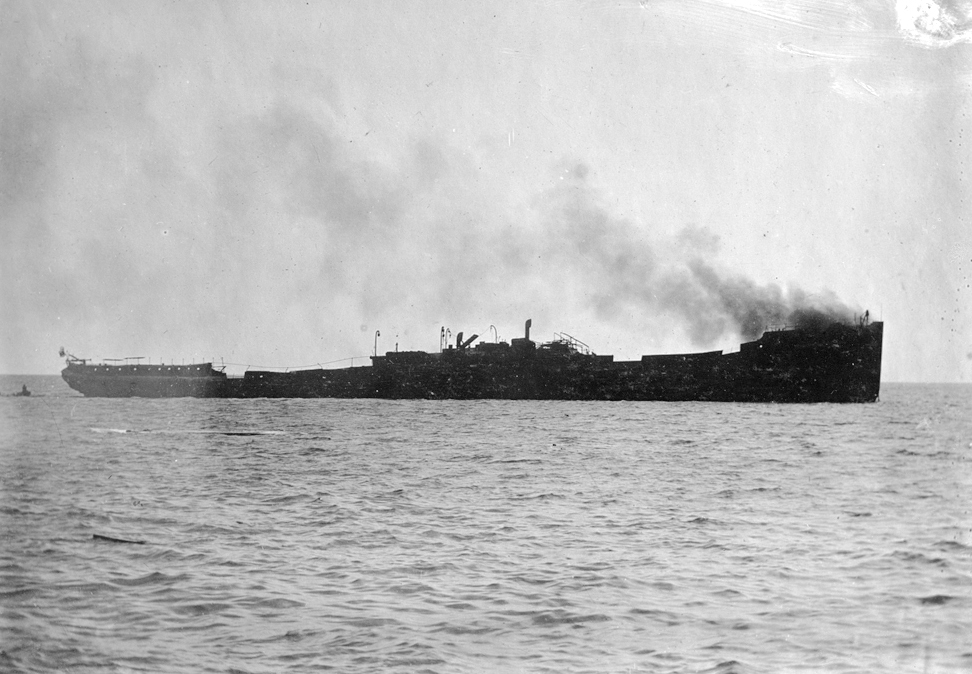
The merchant ship SS Roraima, badly damaged and burning

Suchet was among the vessels to respond to the eruption of Mount Pelée on the island of Martinique that had begun in early 1902. She arrived off the city on 6 May, two days before the main eruption that destroyed the town of Saint-Pierre. She rescued thirty people, all of whom were badly burned, who were able to escape from the city. The British merchant ship SS Roraima caught fire in the harbor, and Suchet came alongside and to help suppress the blaze, but it could not be put out; she instead evacuated the surviving twenty-five of her crew of sixty-eight. Suchet then took the survivors to Fort-de-France and returned to join the evacuation effort for other towns in the area, including Le Prêcheur, over the following days. During these operations, Suchet picked up around 1,200 people and brought them to Fort-de-France by 11 May. Suchet remained in Fort-de-France and her crew helped to unload the supplies that had been sent from other countries in response to the disaster. Le Bris was promoted to the rank of captain for his actions during the disaster.

In June 1902, while Suchet was still engaged with the relief effort for Martinique, the German unprotected cruiser SMS Falke met Suchet in Carúpano, Venezuela. The German commander informed Le Bris that the Venezuelans had arrested seven French merchants over customs duties. Le Bris demanded that they be released, but the local Venezuelan authorities refused. At the same time, the Venezuelan gunboat Restaurador was leaving the harbor. Le Bris trained his guns on the vessel, ordered her to come alongside, and sent an officer to reiterate his demands. This action secured the release of the Frenchmen.

Later in that year, Troude was recommissioned to replace Suchet in the division, allowing the latter to return to France, where she was reduced to reserve status on 20 November to be reboilered. The planned replacement of her boilers was cancelled in 1905 and she was decommissioned on 11 November that year. She was thereafter used as the central ship for the 3rd Flotilla of torpedo boats. Suchet was struck from the naval register on 24 April 1906, but continued on in her role through 1914, during which period she was allocated as an annex to the old floating battery Embuscade. On 28 August 1917, the ship was assigned to support the French merchant marine and was probably used as a mooring hulk at Rochefort through 1927. After salvaging non-ferrous metals from the ship, the Navy sold Suchet in November 1927 to Société Goldenberg.
