= Friant-class cruiser =

Protected cruiser class of the French Navy

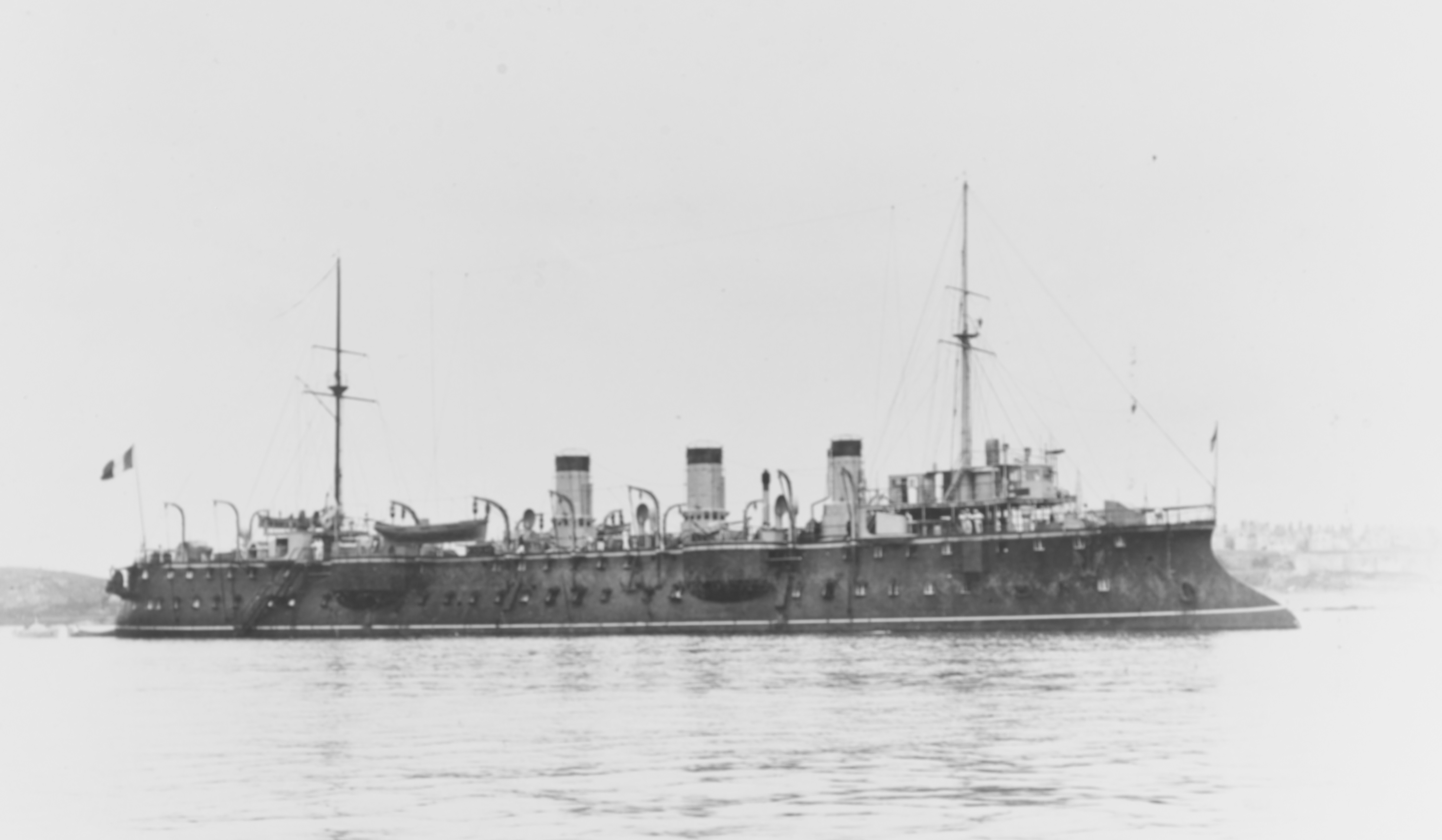
- Friant in port, date unknown

Class overview
- Name: Friant class
- Builders: Arsenal de Brest; Arsenal de Cherbourg
- Operators: French Navy
- Preceded by: Alger
- Succeeded by: Linois class
- Built: 1891–1896
- In commission: 1895–1920
- Completed: 3
- Retired: 3

General characteristics
- Type: Protected cruiser
- Displacement: 3,771 t (3,711 long tons; 4,157 short tons)
- Length: 97.5 m (319 ft 11 in) loa
- Beam: 13.24 m (43 ft 5 in)
- Draft: 5.84 m (19 ft 2 in)
- Installed power: 20–24 × water-tube boilers; 9,000 indicated horsepower (6,700 kW)
- Propulsion: 2 × triple-expansion steam engines; 2 × screw propellers
- Speed: 18.5 knots (34.3 km/h; 21.3 mph)
- Range: 6,000 nmi (11,000 km; 6,900 mi) at 10 kn (19 km/h; 12 mph)
- Complement: 331
- Armament: 6 × 164 mm (6.5 in) guns; 4 × 100 mm (3.9 in) guns; 4 × 47 mm (1.9 in) guns; 11 × 37 mm (1.5 in) guns; 2 × 350 mm (14 in) torpedo tubes
- Armor: Deck: 30 to 80 mm (1.2 to 3.1 in); Conning tower: 75 mm (3 in); Gun shields: 50 mm (2 in)

The Friant class comprised three protected cruisers of the French Navy built in the early 1890s; the three ships were Friant, Bugeaud, and Chasseloup-Laubat. They were ordered as part of a naval construction program directed at France's rivals, Italy and Germany, particularly after Italy made progress in modernizing its own fleet. The plan was also intended to remedy a deficiency in cruisers that had been revealed during training exercises in the 1880s. As such, the Friant-class cruisers were intended to operate as fleet scouts and in the French colonial empire. The ships were armed with a main battery of six 164 mm (6.5 in) guns supported by four 100 mm (3.9 in) guns and they had a top speed of 18.7 knots (34.6 km/h; 21.5 mph).

Friant and Chasseloup-Laubaut initially served with the Northern Squadron, while Bugeaud operated in the cruiser force of the Mediterranean Squadron, France's main battle fleet. Bugeaud became the flagship of the Levant Division in 1898, which operated as part of the International Squadron that intervened in the Cretan Revolt of 1897–1898. All three members of the class were sent to East Asia in response to the Boxer Uprising in Qing China by 1901, and they remained in the region through the mid-1900s. Bugeaud was badly worn out by her time in the Far East, and she was sold for scrap in 1907. That year, Chasseloup-Laubat visited the United States during the Jamestown Exposition.

Chasseloup-Laubat was reduced to a storage hulk in 1911, but Friant remained in active service through the start of World War I in August 1914. She operated with cruiser squadrons patrolling for German commerce raiders early in the war and was later sent to patrol the formerly-German colony of Kamerun. Chasseloup-Laubat was converted into a distilling ship to support the main French fleet at Corfu while Friant ended the war having been rebuilt into a repair ship. The latter vessel was sold for scrap in 1920, while Chasseloup-Laubat ultimately foundered in 1926 after having been abandoned in the bay of Nouadhibou, French Mauritania.

== Background ==
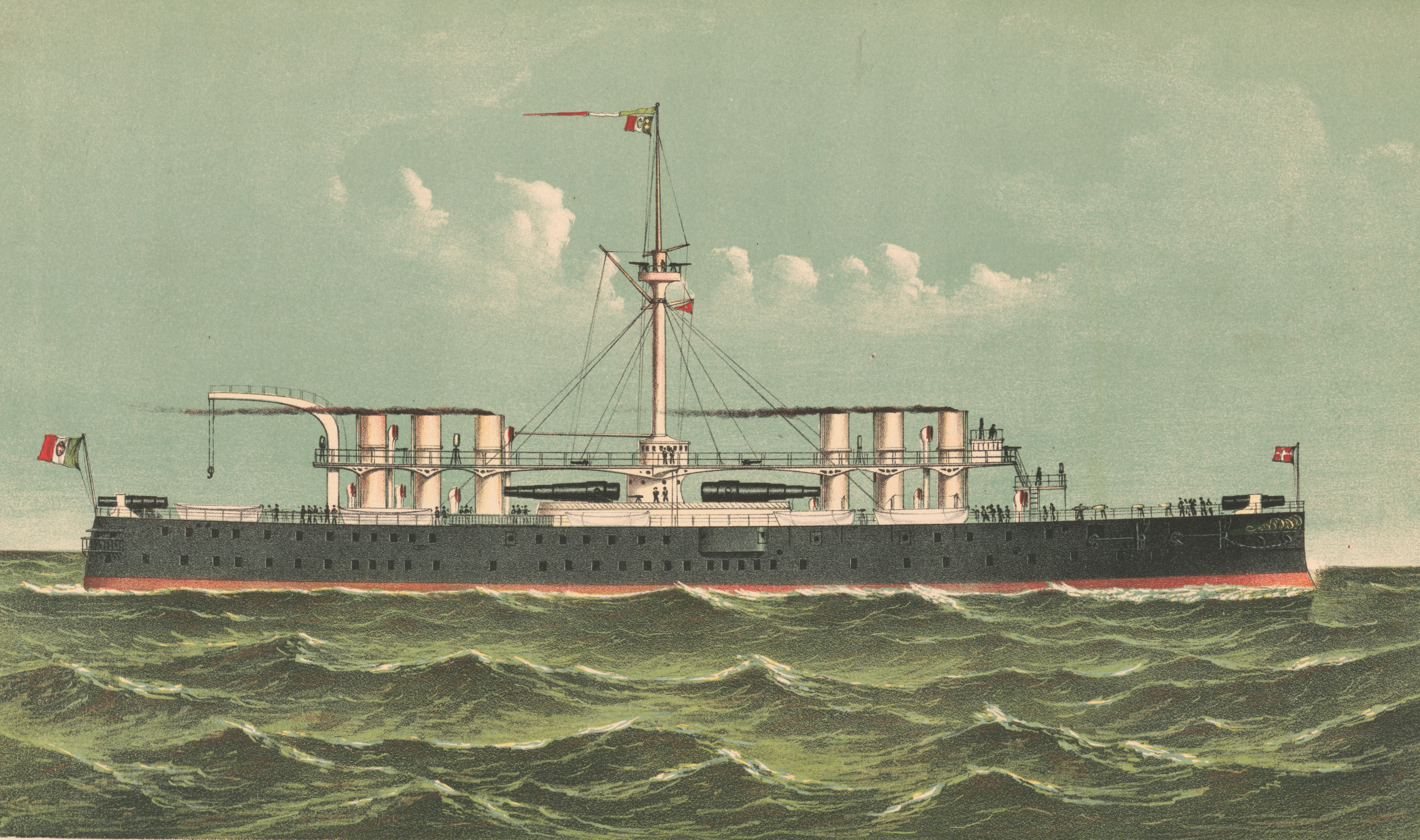
The fast Italian ironclad Italia, the threat of which prompted the French naval program of 1890

In the late 1880s, the Italian Regia Marina (Royal Navy) accelerated construction of ships for its fleet and reorganized the most modern ironclad battleships—the Duilio and Italia classes—into a fast squadron suitable for offensive operations. These developments provoked a strong response in the French press. The Budget Committee in the French Chamber of Deputies began to press for a "two-power standard" in 1888, which would see the French fleet enlarged to equal the combined Italian and German fleets, then France's two main rivals on the continent. This initially came to nothing, as the supporters of the Jeune École doctrine called for a fleet largely based on squadrons of torpedo boats to defend the French coasts rather than an expensive fleet of ironclads. This view had significant support in the Chamber of Deputies.

The next year, a war scare with Italy led to further demands to strengthen the fleet. The visit of a German squadron of four ironclads to Italy compounded French concerns about a combined Italo-German fleet that would dramatically outnumber their own. Training exercises held in France that year demonstrated that the slower French fleet would be unable to prevent the faster Italian squadron from bombarding the French coast at will, in part because it lacked enough cruisers (and doctrine to use them) to scout for the enemy ships.

To correct the weaknesses of the French fleet, on 22 November 1890, the Superior Naval Council authorized a new construction program directed not at simple parity with the Italian and German fleets, but numerical superiority. In addition to twenty-four new battleships, a total of seventy cruisers were to be built for use in home waters and overseas in the French colonial empire. The Friant class were the first group of protected cruisers to be authorized under the program.

== Design ==
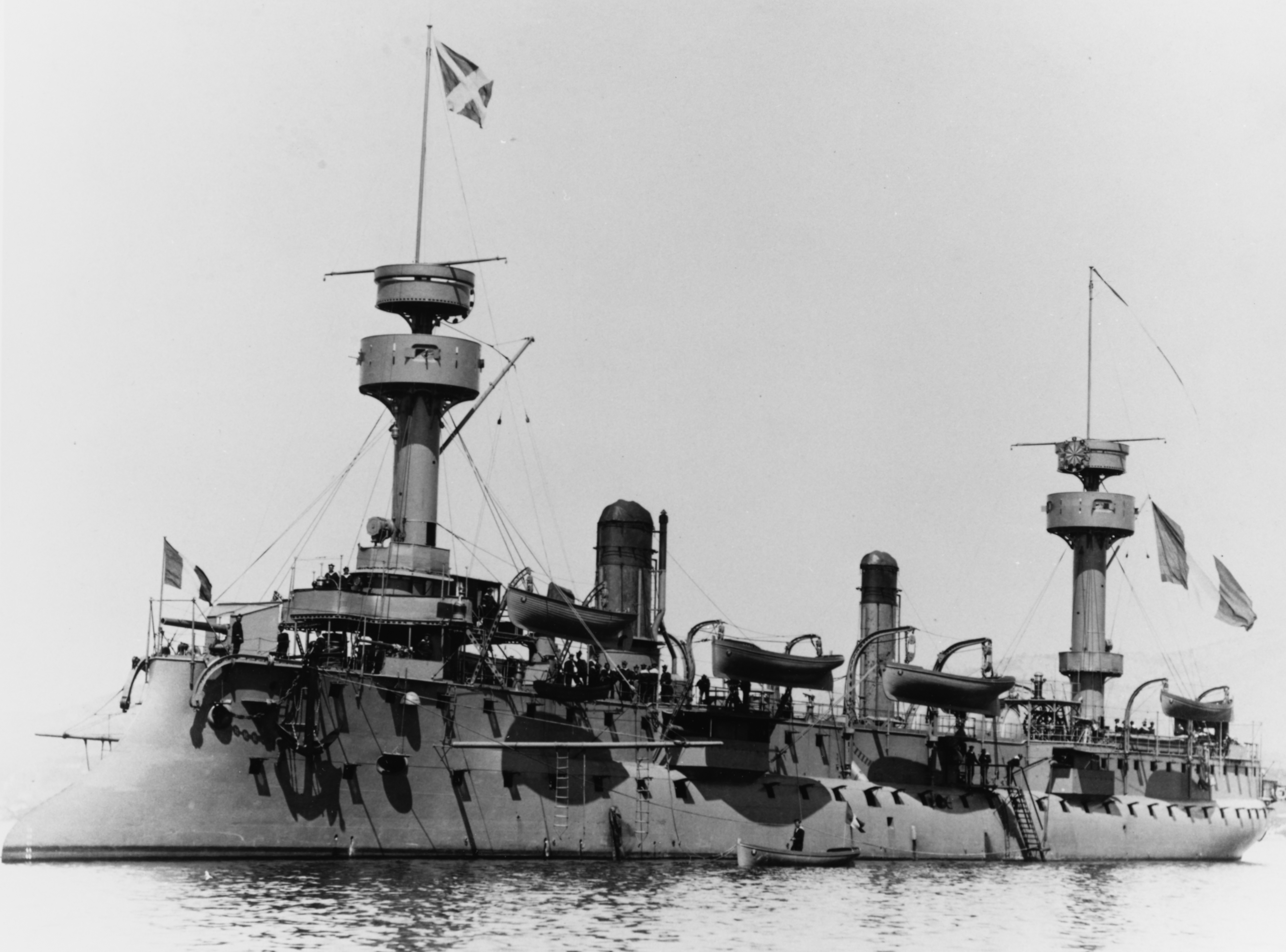
Davout, the basis for the Friant design

On 28 March 1890, the French naval minister, Édouard Barbey, requested a new design for an improved version of the cruiser Davout from Delphin Albert Lhomme, the supervisor of construction at Toulon. The new ship was to be larger, which would permit several improvements over the earlier ship, including a longer cruising radius, more powerful armament, and improved armor protection. Barbey specified the new ship was to be able to cruise for 6,000 nautical miles (11,000 km; 6,900 mi) at a speed of 10 knots (19 km/h; 12 mph) under normal conditions, the armament was to consist of a main battery of six 164.7 mm (6.48 in) guns, and water-tube boilers were to be used instead of the fire-tube boilers used in earlier French cruisers. The ship would have a minimum speed of 18 knots (33 km/h; 21 mph) under normal conditions and 18.5 to 19 knots (34.3 to 35.2 km/h; 21.3 to 21.9 mph) using forced draft. He set the displacement at around 3,600 t (3,500 long tons; 4,000 short tons). To these specifications, Lhomme added a secondary battery of four 100 mm (3.9 in) guns.

On 21 August, Lhomme submitted his proposal, which Barbey forwarded to the Conseil des Travaux (Council of Works) six days later for review. During a meeting on 28 October, the Conseil approved the design, but significant revisions were to follow as work on the vessels began. Already on 17 November, Barbey ordered that the originally planned M1881/84 pattern of 164.7 mm gun was to be replaced with the newly designed M1891 pattern, which had a longer barrel and were fitted with gun shields. These improvements made the guns heavier, which in turn necessitated alterations to the superstructure to reduce topweight. As the ships neared completion, the naval minister, Auguste Alfred Lefèvre, made the decision on 12 March 1894 to cut down the originally intended military masts and replace the upper portion with lighter pole masts. The fighting top was to be retained, but it was determined that it would have to be removed to improve stability, which Gustave Besnard, by then the naval minister, ordered on 16 February 1895. The military masts were removed altogether, and 66 t (65 long tons; 73 short tons) of ballast was added to the ships. He also instructed the shipyards to delete the originally planned torpedo tubes from the stern and broadside positions, leaving only a pair of tubes in the bow.

The first two ships, Friant and Chasseloup-Laubat, were ordered in late 1890, and the third, Bugeaud, was ordered in early 1891. They were fitted with three different types of water-tube boilers to compare their performance in service. They all proved to be somewhat of a disappointment, as all three could not match Davout in speed despite having greater horsepower. This was primarily the result of poor combustion in the boilers, particularly the Niclausse boilers installed aboard Friant. The ships' hull form, while inspired by Davout's, had poor lines at the bow that caused the ships to trim down by around 30 cm (12 in) when cruising at high speeds. Additionally, weights in the ships were poorly distributed along their length, which contributed to poor handling.

=== General characteristics and machinery ===
Plan and profile drawing of the Friant class

The ships of the Friant class were 94 m (308 ft 5 in) long between perpendiculars, 97.05 m (318 ft 5 in) long at the waterline, and 97.5 m (319 ft 11 in) long overall. They had a beam of 13.24 m (43 ft 5 in) and an average draft of 5.84 m (19 ft 2 in), which increased to 6.41 m (21.0 ft) aft. They displaced 3,771 t (3,711 long tons; 4,157 short tons) as designed. The ships' hulls featured a pronounced ram bow (that was not reinforced for use in ramming attacks) and a tumblehome shape, which were common characteristics of major French warships of the period. They had a forecastle deck that extended for almost the entire length of the ship, terminating with a short quarterdeck aft and a sloped stern. Their superstructure consisted of a main conning tower with a bridge forward and a smaller, secondary conning tower aft. Each ship was originally to be fitted with a pair of heavy military masts with fighting tops, but stability problems with Friant forced them to be replaced with lighter pole masts carrying only observation positions. Steering was controlled by a single rudder. Chasseloup-Laubat was fitted with bilge keels to improve her stability. Their crew consisted of 331 to 339 officers and enlisted men.

The ships' propulsion system consisted of a pair of 3-cylinder, triple-expansion steam engines driving two screw propellers. Steam was provided by twenty coal-burning water-tube boilers of the Niclausse type for Friant and the Lagrafel d'Allest type for Chasseloup-Laubat, while Bugeaud received twenty-four Belleville boilers. All of the ships' boiler rooms were ducted into three funnels. Their machinery was rated to produce 9,000 indicated horsepower (6,700 kW) for a top speed of 18.5 knots (34.3 km/h; 21.3 mph). During sea trials, all three ships exceeded these figures, reaching between 18.77 and 18.95 knots (34.76 and 35.10 km/h; 21.60 and 21.81 mph) from 9,623 to 9,811 ihp (7,176 to 7,316 kW). Coal storage amounted to 600 t (590 long tons; 660 short tons) normally and up to 740 t (730 long tons; 820 short tons), which provided a cruising range of 3,550 nautical miles (6,570 km; 4,090 mi) at a speed of 10 knots (19 km/h; 12 mph), though Friant could steam for 5,818 nmi (10,775 km; 6,695 mi) at 11 knots (20 km/h; 13 mph); the historian Stephen Roberts notes that this was "possibly with max coal".

=== Armament and armor ===
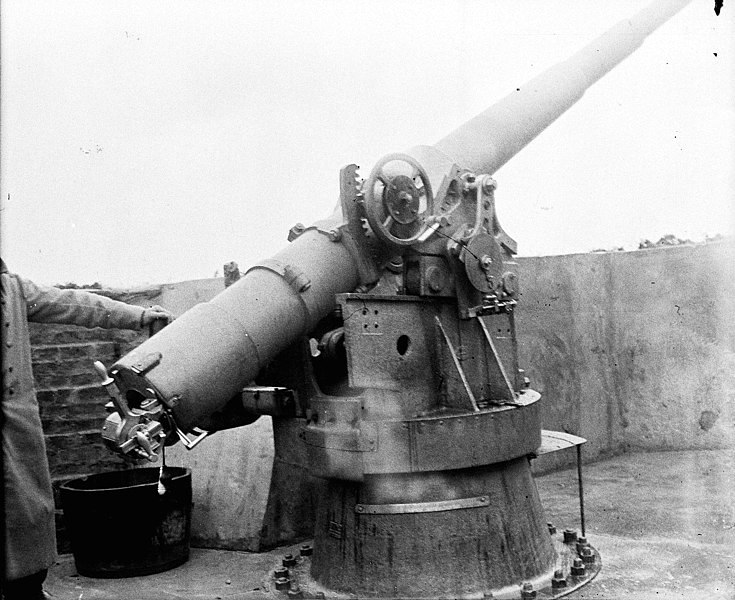
A 100 mm (3.9 in) Model 1891 gun in a pivot mount

The ships were armed with a main battery of six 164 mm (6.5 in) 45-caliber guns. They were placed in individual pivot mounts; one was on the forecastle, two were in sponsons abreast the conning tower, another pair were in sponsons just forward of the aft conning tower, and the last was on the stern. They were supplied with a variety of shells, including solid, 45 kg (99 lb) cast iron projectiles, and explosive armor-piercing (AP) and semi-armor-piercing (SAP) shells that weighed 54.2 kg (119 lb) and 52.6 kg (116 lb), respectively. The guns fired with a muzzle velocity of 770 to 800 m/s (2,500 to 2,600 ft/s).

The ships' offensive armament was augmented by a secondary battery of four 100 mm (3.9 in) Modèle 1891 guns, which were carried in pivot mounts in the conning towers, one on each side per tower. The guns fired 14 kg (31 lb) cast iron and 16 kg (35 lb) AP shells with a muzzle velocity of 710 to 740 m/s (2,300 to 2,400 ft/s). All of the primary and secondary guns were fitted with gun shields to protect their crews. The offensive weaponry was rounded out by two 350 mm (14 in) torpedo tubes that were carried in their hulls above the waterline, one on either side.

For close-range defense against torpedo boats, they carried a battery of numerous small-caliber, quick-firing guns. This comprised four 47 mm (1.9 in) 3-pounder Hotchkiss guns and eleven 37 mm (1.5 in) 1-pounder guns, all in individual mounts. The former were carried in pairs in the forward and aft conning towers on the upper deck; the latter were distributed around the ships, including atop the sponsons for the main guns and higher in the superstructure.

Armor protection consisted of a curved armor deck that was 30 mm (1.2 in) thick on the flat, which increased to 80 mm (3.1 in) on the sloped sides, where it provided a measure of vertical protection. Above the deck at the sides, a cofferdam filled with cellulose was intended to contain flooding from damage below the waterline. Below the main deck, a thin splinter deck covered the propulsion machinery spaces to protect them from shell fragments. Their forward conning towers had 75 mm (3 in) thick plating on the sides. The gun shields were 50 mm (2 in) thick.

== Construction ==
Bugeaud early in her career

Construction data
Name	Laid down	Launched	Completed	Shipyard
Friant	1891	17 April 1893	April 1895	Arsenal de Brest, Brest
Bugeaud	June 1891	29 August 1893	May 1896	Arsenal de Cherbourg, Cherbourg
Chasseloup-Laubat	June 1891	17 April 1893	1895	Arsenal de Cherbourg, Cherbourg

== Service history ==
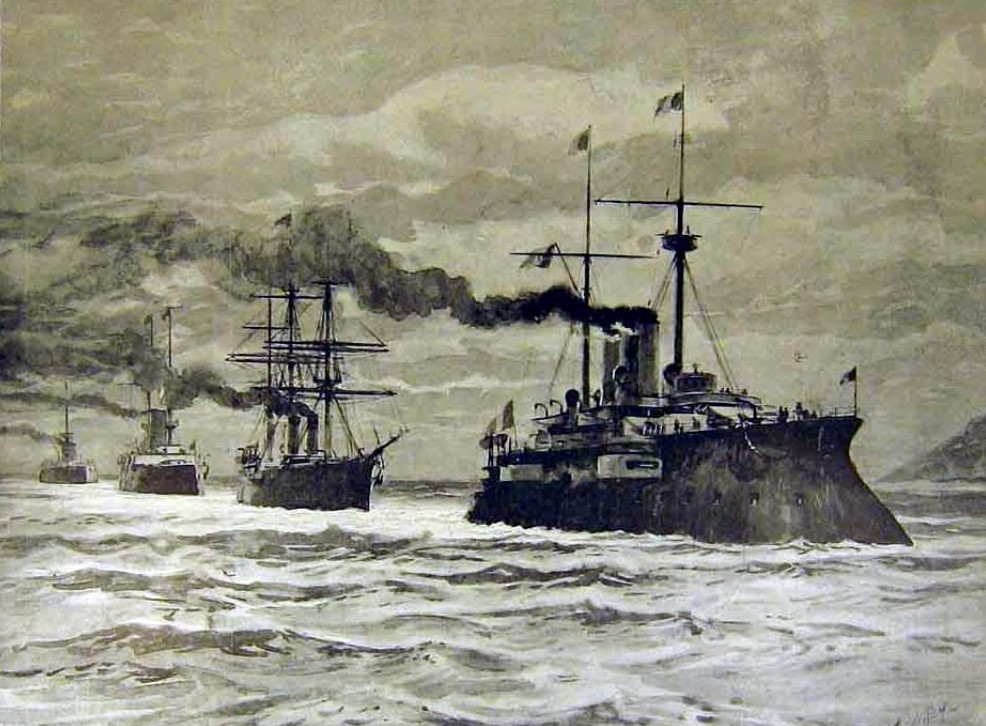
Bugeaud leading ships of the International Squadron to Crete in 1898

Friant and Chasseloup-Laubat spent their first years in service assigned to the Northern Squadron, based in the English Channel. Bugeaud was instead assigned to the Mediterranean Squadron, France's primary battle fleet. In both units, the ships were primarily occupied with training exercises. In 1898, Bugeaud transferred to serve as the flagship of the Levant Division in the eastern Mediterranean. During that time, she participated in the International Squadron, composed of ships from several of the Great Powers, that intervened in the Cretan Revolt of 1897–1898.

Bugeaud was deployed to East Asia by early 1900 in response to the Boxer Uprising, and the other two members of the class had followed her there by 1901, and they remained in the region after the conflict ended. After returning to France in the mid-1900s, Friant received new boilers and thereafter returned to fleet operations. Meanwhile, the poor shipyard facilities in the Far East prevented sufficient maintenance being done for Bugeaud, and she was in a poor state by 1907. Unable to economically repair her, the French Navy struck the ship from the naval register and sold her for scrap. That year, Chasseloup-Laubat took part in a visit to the United States for the Jamestown Exposition. She was later hulked in 1911 and disarmed in 1913.

At the start of World War I in August 1914, Friant was on station in France's colonies in the Americas. She was initially assigned to a cruiser squadron to patrol the western end of the English Channel. In September, she was moved to French Morocco to join a group of cruisers patrolling for German commerce raiders. At some point after the start of the conflict, Chasseloup-Laubat was converted into a distilling ship to support the main French fleet at Corfu. Friant was later moved to the Gulf of Guinea to patrol Germany's colony of Kamerun in western Africa. She ended the war having been converted into a repair ship based in Morocco and later at Mudros to support a flotilla of submarines. She was struck from the naval register in 1920 and sold to ship breakers. Chasseloup-Laubat was sent to Port Etienne, French Mauritania, to supply the colony with water and eventually sank in 1926 in the bay of Nouadhibou after having been abandoned.
