= French cruiser Bugeaud =

Protected cruiser of the French Navy

- Bugeaud

History

France
- Name: Bugeaud
- Namesake: Thomas Robert Bugeaud
- Ordered: 29 January 1891
- Builder: Arsenal de Cherbourg
- Laid down: 5 April 1892
- Launched: 29 August 1893
- Commissioned: 25 March 1895
- In service: 24 June 1896

History
- Decommissioned: 26 October 1905
- Stricken: 9 April 1906
- Fate: Broken up

General characteristics
- Class & type: Friant-class cruiser
- Displacement: 3,771 t (3,711 long tons; 4,157 short tons)
- Length: 97.5 m (319 ft 11 in) loa
- Beam: 13.24 m (43 ft 5 in)
- Draft: 5.84 m (19 ft 2 in)
- Installed power: 20–24 × water-tube boilers; 9,000 indicated horsepower (6,700 kW)
- Propulsion: 2 × triple-expansion steam engines; 2 × screw propellers
- Speed: 18.5 knots (34.3 km/h; 21.3 mph)
- Range: 6,000 nmi (11,000 km; 6,900 mi) at 10 kn (19 km/h; 12 mph)
- Complement: 331
- Armament: 6 × 164 mm (6.5 in) guns; 4 × 100 mm (3.9 in) guns; 4 × 47 mm (1.9 in) guns; 11 × 37 mm (1.5 in) guns; 2 × 350 mm (14 in) torpedo tubes
- Armor: Deck: 30 to 80 mm (1.2 to 3.1 in); Conning tower: 75 mm (3 in); Gun shields: 50 mm (2 in)

Bugeaud [by.ɡo] was a Friant-class protected cruiser of the French Navy built in the 1890s, the second of three ships of the class. The Friant-class cruisers were ordered as part of a construction program directed at strengthening the fleet's cruiser force. At the time, France was concerned with the growing naval threat of the Italian and German fleets, and the new cruisers were intended to serve with the main fleet, and overseas in the French colonial empire. Bugeaud and her two sister ships were armed with a main battery of six 164 mm (6.5 in) guns, were protected by an armor deck that was 30 to 80 mm (1.2 to 3.1 in) thick, and were capable of steaming at a top speed of 18.7 knots (34.6 km/h; 21.5 mph).

Bugeaud was initially assigned to the Mediterranean Squadron after her completion in 1896 before being transferred to serve as the flagship of the Levant Division in the eastern Mediterranean. During that time, she participated in the International Squadron that intervened in the Cretan Revolt of 1897–1898. Bugead was sent to East Asia in 1900 in response to the Boxer Uprising in Qing China, where she remained for the next several years. Shipyard facilities were poor, and an overhaul conducted in 1903 took more than six months to complete; even afterward, Bugeaud was in poor condition, and she was struck from the naval register in 1907 and then broken up.

== Design ==
Plan and profile drawing of the Friant class

In response to a war scare with Italy in the late 1880s, the French Navy embarked on a major construction program in 1890 to counter the threat of the Italian fleet and that of Italy's ally Germany. The plan called for a total of seventy cruisers for use in home waters and overseas in the French colonial empire. The Friant class was the first group of protected cruisers to be authorized under the program.

Bugeaud was 94 m (308 ft 5 in) long between perpendiculars and 97.5 m (320 ft) long overall, with a beam of 13.24 m (43 ft 5 in) and an average draft of 5.84 m (19 ft 2 in). She displaced 3,771 t (3,711 long tons; 4,157 short tons) as designed. Her crew consisted of 331 officers and enlisted men. The ship's propulsion system consisted of a pair of triple-expansion steam engines driving two screw propellers. Steam was provided by twenty-four coal-burning Belleville-type water-tube boilers that were ducted into three funnels. Her machinery was rated to produce 9,000 indicated horsepower (6,700 kW) for a top speed of 18.5 knots (34.3 km/h; 21.3 mph), though the ship slightly exceeded those figures during initial speed testing, reaching a speed of 18.95 knots (35.10 km/h; 21.81 mph) from 9,913 ihp (7,392 kW). She had a cruising range of 6,000 nautical miles (11,000 km; 6,900 mi) at a speed of 10 knots (19 km/h; 12 mph).

The ship was armed with a main battery of six 164 mm (6.5 in) 45-caliber guns. They were placed in individual pivot mounts; one was on the forecastle, two were in sponsons abreast the conning tower, and the last was on the stern. These were supported by a secondary battery of four 100 mm (3.9 in) guns, which were carried in pivot mounts in the conning towers, one on each side per tower. For close-range defense against torpedo boats, she carried four 47 mm (1.9 in) 3-pounder Hotchkiss guns and eleven 37 mm (1.5 in) 1-pounder guns. She was also armed with two 350 mm (14 in) torpedo tubes in her hull above the waterline. Armor protection consisted of a curved armor deck that was 30 to 80 mm (1.2 to 3.1 in) thick, along with 75 mm (3 in) plating on the conning tower.

== Service history ==
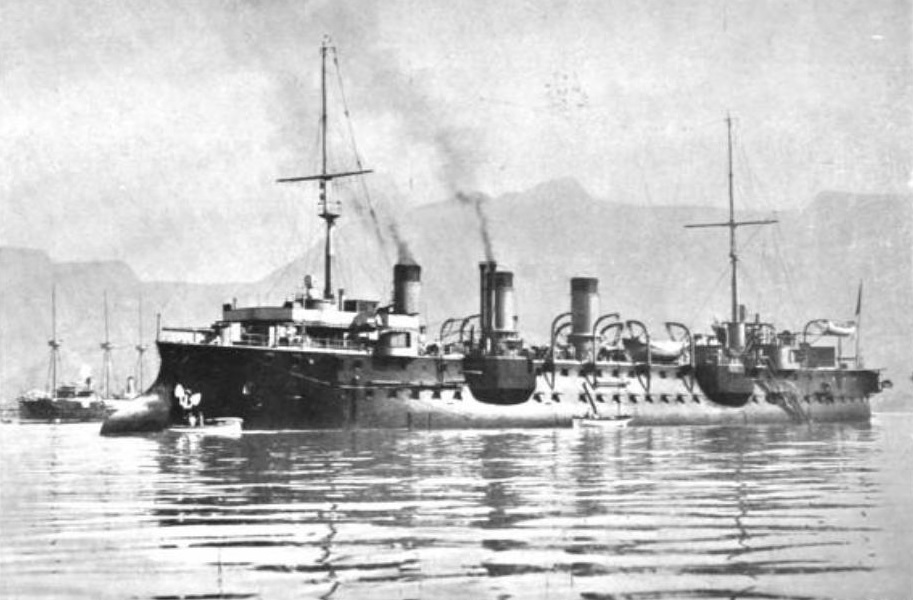
Bugeaud early in her career, c. 1896–1897

Bugeaud was ordered on 29 January 1891, and her keel was laid down at the Arsenal de Cherbourg in Cherbourg on 5 April 1892. Her completed hull was launched on 29 August 1893, and after completing fitting out, she was commissioned to begin sea trials on 25 March 1895. Her initial testing revealed the need for alterations to improve her ventilation. Successful trials were held in April, during which she reached a top speed of 19 knots (35 km/h; 22 mph). She placed in full commission on 24 June 1896, the last member of her class to enter service. She joined the Mediterranean Squadron on 8 July, in time to participate in that year's fleet maneuvers with the rest of the unit. She served in the cruiser screen for the 1st Division, along with the armored cruiser Amiral Charner and the torpedo cruisers Wattignies and D'Iberville. The maneuvers for that year took place from 6 to 30 July.

Bugeaud was transferred to the Levant Division in 1897, but engine problems forced her to return to Toulon for repairs, her place in the division being taken by the cruiser Suchet. Bugeaud was reassigned to the Mediterranean Squadron after repairs were completed later that year. She was still in service with the squadron in 1898. Later that year, she was deployed to the coast of Ottoman Syria, where she relieved Amiral Charner as the flagship of the Levant Division. The unit at that time also included the torpedo cruisers Vautour, Faucon, and Condor. The divisional commander at the time was Vice Admiral Édouard Pottier. During this period, she served with the International Squadron that intervened in the Cretan Revolt. She carried Prince George of Greece and Denmark to Crete, where he became the High Commissioner of the Cretan State, part of the negotiated settlement to the conflict. The International Squadron was thereafter disbanded.

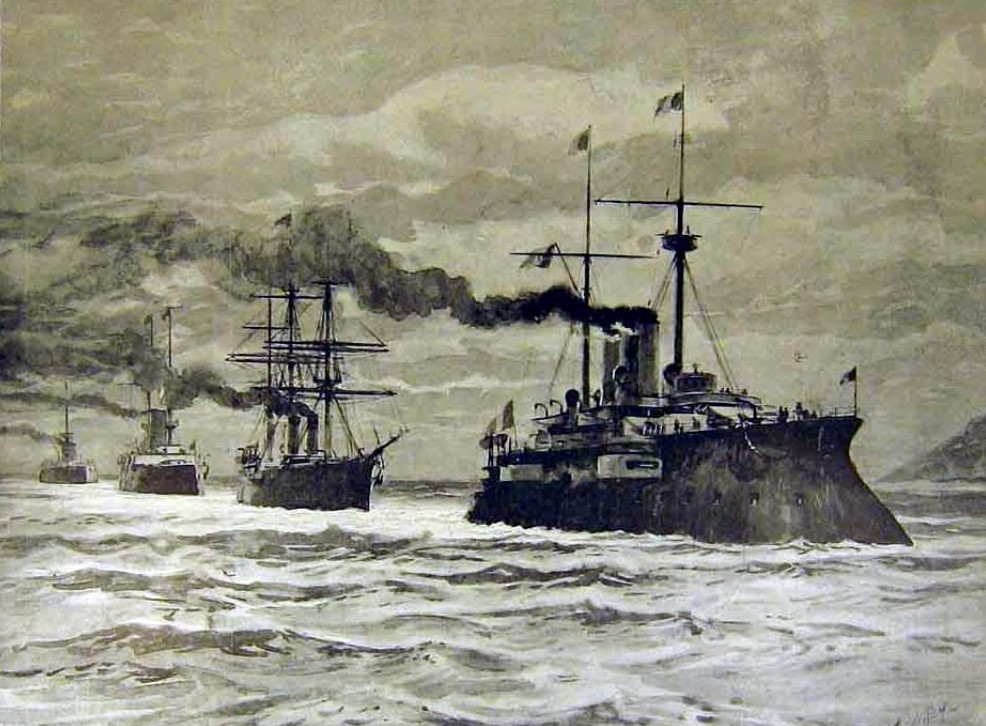
Bugeaud leading ships of the International Squadron to Crete in 1898

Bugeaud was deployed to East Asia in February 1900, and both of her sister ships had joined her there by January 1901 as part of the response to the Boxer Uprising in Qing China; at that time, six other cruisers were assigned to the station in addition to the three Friant-class ships. She remained in East Asian waters in 1902, but with fighting over in China, the unit began to be reduced in size. By 1903, the unit consisted of the armored cruiser Montcalm and the protected cruisers Châteaurenault and Pascal. Later that year, Bugeaud underwent an overhaul in Saigon that lasted some six months; the lengthy period out of service resulted from the insufficient shipyard facilities in French Indochina. Despite the work, Bugeaud was still in poor condition by 1904, being unable to exceed 16 to 18 knots (30 to 33 km/h; 18 to 21 mph).

After arriving home in 1905, the ship was decommissioned at Rochefort on 26 October. She was struck from the naval register on 9 April 1906, and was eventually sold to the firm Frank Rijsdijk' Scheepssloperij of Dordrecht, Netherlands. Bugeaud was then towed to Hendrik-Ido-Ambacht, where she was subsequently broken up.
