= Canon de 305 mm Modèle 1887 =

- The French battleship Jaureguiberry with its fore/aft 305 mm modèle 1887 guns.
- Type: Naval gun Railway artillery
- Place of origin: France

Service history
- In service: 1887-1945
- Used by: France
- Wars: World War I World War II

Specifications
- Mass: 45.7 t (50 short tons)
- Length: 13.9 m (46 ft)
- Barrel length: 13.5 m (44 ft)
- Shell: Separate loading bagged charges and projectile
- Shell weight: 292–340 kg (644–750 lb)
- Caliber: 305 mm (12 in) 45 caliber
- Elevation: -5° to +15°
- Traverse: -150° to +150°
- Rate of fire: 1 rpm
- Muzzle velocity: 780–815 m/s (2,560–2,670 ft/s)
- Maximum firing range: 12 km (7.5 mi) at +15°

The Canon de 305 mm Modèle 1887 was a heavy naval gun used as the main armament of a number of French pre-dreadnoughts and coastal defense ships during World War I. Eight were converted to railway artillery in World War I and four were used during World War II.

== Construction ==
The Canon de 305 mm Modèle 1887 45 caliber gun was a typical French built-up gun of the period. It used a Welin interrupted-screw breech and separate loading bagged charges and projectiles. It was mounted in single gun turrets which had a couple of unusual features. First, most of the turret's operating machinery was housed inside the turret, with only an armored tube to protect the ammunition hoists. This made little difference in the overall weight of the turret but did raise the machinery higher in the ship than the turrets of other nations, which did have implications for stability. Secondly, they used a hydraulic pivot to lift the turret when it rotated; this was lowered onto a seating ring when the turret was in the proper position to fire.

== Naval use ==
The mle 1887 equipped three French pre-dreadnought battleships:

- Charles Martel - The mle 1887 formed the primary armament of this pre-dreadnought battleship. There were two single gun turrets mounted fore and aft of the ship's superstructure. These were complemented by a secondary armament of two Canon de 274 mm Modèle 1887 single gun turrets port and starboard of the ship's superstructure. The four turrets together formed a lozenge pattern.
- Carnot - The mle 1887 formed the primary armament of this pre-dreadnought battleship. There were two single gun turrets mounted fore and aft of the ship's superstructure. These were complemented by a secondary armament of two Canon de 274 mm Modèle 1887 single gun turrets port and starboard of the ship's superstructure. The four turrets together formed a lozenge pattern.
- Jauréguiberry - The mle 1887 formed the primary armament of this pre-dreadnought battleship. There were two single gun turrets mounted fore and aft of the ship's superstructure. These were complemented by a secondary armament of two Canon de 274 mm Modèle 1887 single gun turrets port and starboard of the ship's superstructure. The four turrets together formed a lozenge pattern.

The mle 1887 equipped two French coastal defense ships:

- Bouvines class - The mle 1887 formed the primary armament of the Bouvines and Amiral-Tréhouart. There were two single gun turrets mounted fore and aft of the ship's superstructure. The ship's secondary armament consisted of eight 100 mm (3.9 in) 45 caliber Modèle 1892 guns, four of which were mounted in individual casemates. The other four were carried on pivot mounts with gun shields on the shelter deck directly above the four casemated guns on the corners of the superstructure.

== Railway artillery ==
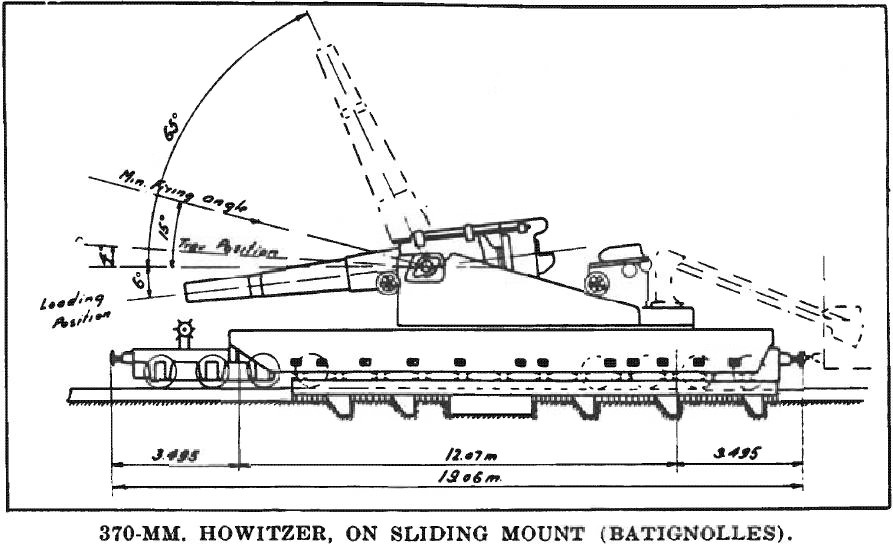
A diagram showing the Batignolles carriage system.

The Obusier de 370 modèle 1915 was a conversion of the mle 1887 by shortening the barrels to 25 calibers and boring them out to 370 mm (15 in). It was proposed to convert eight gun barrels to railway artillery with another four spare barrels. The barrels for these guns would come from decommissioned ships of the Charles Martel class of pre-dreadnought battleships and Bouvines class coastal defense ships. The work of building the guns was split between Schneider and Batignolles each producing four guns.

There were slight differences between the two groups of four guns. For example, a 370 mle 1915 with gun barrels from the battleship Charles Martel weighed 127 tonnes, while the others from the Bouvines class of coastal defense ships weighed 134 tonnes. Whether there were any ballistic differences between the finished pieces is unknown.

The Obusier de 370 mm mle 1915 was considered a howitzer instead of a gun, so range and velocity were not primary considerations. Instead, high angle fire, projectile weight, and explosive yield were the primary considerations. Traverse was accomplished by using a section of curved track. Seven of the eight guns survived the first world war and four were captured by the Germans during the second world war their designation was 37 cm H(E) 711(f) and they used them throughout the second world war.

== Ammunition ==
The mle 1887 was equipped with three different types of shell:

- Armor-Piercing (AP) - 292 kg (644 lb) at 815 m/s (2,670 ft/s)
- Semi-Armor-Piercing (SAP) - 340 kg (750 lb) at 815 m/s (2,670 ft/s)
- Common-Incendiary (CI) - 292 kg (644 lb) at 815 m/s (2,670 ft/s)
