= List of protected cruisers of France =

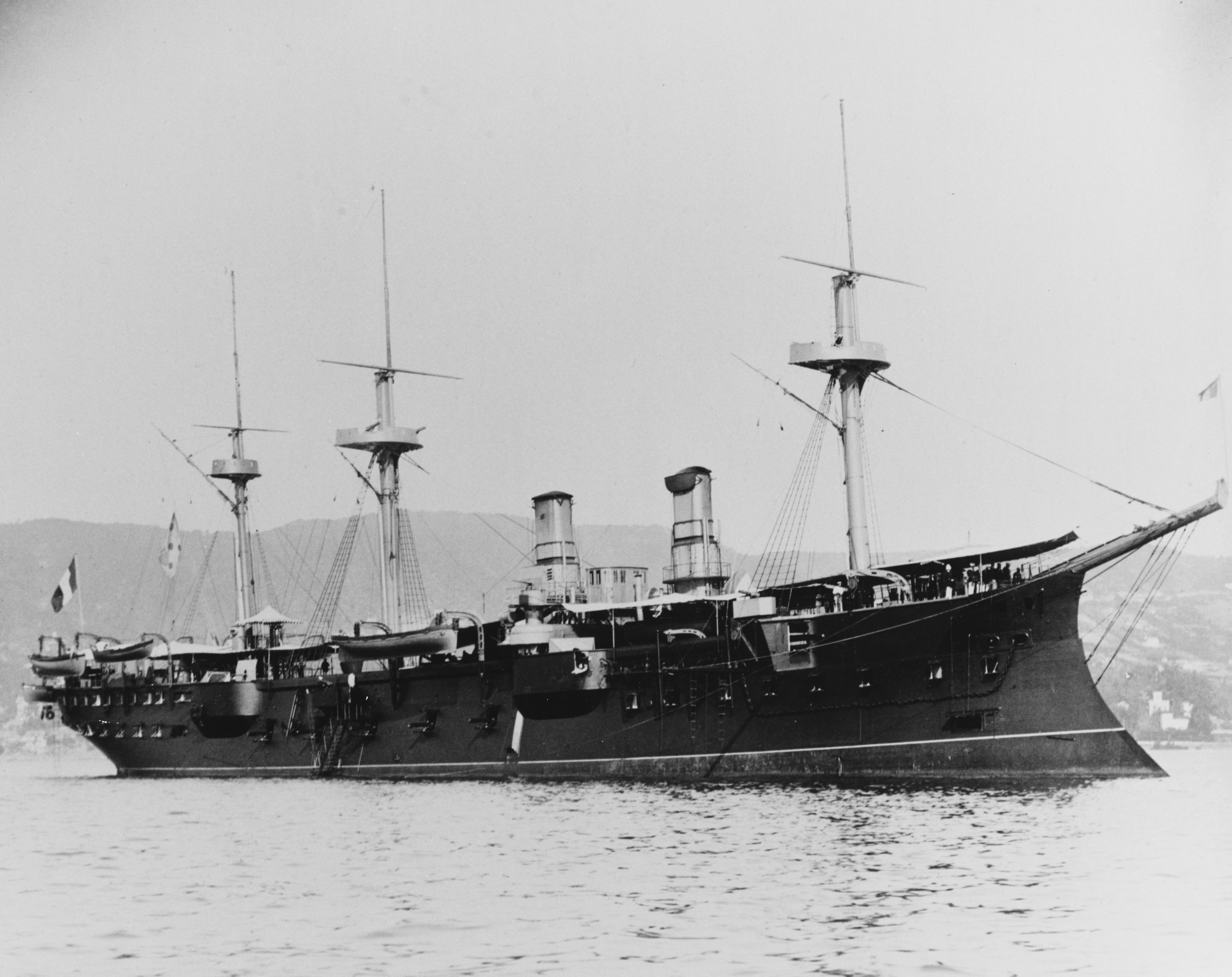
Sfax, the first French protected cruiser, after her refit

Over the 1880s and 1890s, the French Navy built a series of protected cruisers, thirty-three vessels in total. Protected cruisers were differentiated from other cruising warships by their relatively light sloped armor deck that provided a measure of protection against incoming shellfire, as opposed to armored cruisers that relied on heavy belt armor, or unprotected cruisers that lacked armor entirely. They were designed to fulfill a variety of roles, including fleet scouts, colonial cruisers, and commerce raiders. Arguments over the purpose of the French fleet during this period played a major role in the design of these ships; proponents of the Jeune École doctrine favored large cruisers capable of attacking enemy merchant shipping while traditionalist officers preferred vessels more suited to fleet operations. A third group sought more cruisers to expand and defend the French colonial empire. The period was also marked by strategic confusion in the French naval command, as the country reoriented from its traditional rivalry with Great Britain to the perceived threat posed by the Italo-German alliance.

The first French protected cruiser, Sfax, was designed in the early 1880s in response to the introduction of similar vessels in the British Royal Navy; two more vessels of similar but larger designs—Tage and Amiral Cécille—followed shortly thereafter. By 1886, the pro-Jeune École Admiral Théophile Aube became the French Minister of Marine and initiated a large construction program that included the cruisers Davout, Suchet, and Alger, and the three-ship Forbin, Troude, and Jean Bart classes. The early 1890s saw the construction of the Friant and D'Assas classes, derivatives of the Davout design, and the Linois-class cruisers, which were improvements on the Troude and Forbin types. The colonial cruisers of the Descartes and Catinat classes were also built during this period.

Beginning in the mid-1890s, a series of large cruisers were ordered; the first of these, D'Entrecasteaux, carried the largest guns of any French cruiser, and was intended to serve as a flagship of the squadron stationed in French Indochina, while three more vessels, Guichen, Châteaurenault, and Jurien de la Gravière, were designed to serve as long-range commerce destroyers. Two final colonial cruisers of the D'Estrées class were also built during this period.

Most of the vessels had relatively uneventful careers, serving in a variety of locations with the main fleets, in the French colonies in Asia, and on patrol in the Atlantic. Two were lost in accidents, Jean Bart and Infernet, in 1907 and 1910, respectively. Many of the ships had either been broken up or reduced to secondary roles by the start of World War I in August 1914, but several saw action, including Jurien de la Gravière at the Battle of Antivari and a number of vessels along the coast of Ottoman Syria. One vessel, Châteaurenault, was lost during the war to a German U-boat attack in 1917. Most of the surviving protected cruisers were discarded in the post-war reduction of the French Navy, though a few lingered on in service as hulks into the 1920s or later. D'Entrecasteaux remained in service the longest, being loaned to the Belgian Navy in the mid-1920s and then sold to the Polish Navy in 1927; she was ultimately seized by German forces during the Invasion of Poland in 1939 and scrapped in 1942.

Key
Armament	The number and type of the primary armament
Armor	The thickness of the deck armor
Displacement	Ship displacement at full load
Propulsion	Number of shafts, type of propulsion system, and top speed generated
Service	The dates work began and finished on the ship and its ultimate fate
Laid down	The date the keel began to be assembled

== Sfax ==
Sfax early in her career

The French Navy embarked on a construction program in 1878 that included a series of new cruisers. The Conseil des Travaux (Council of Works) intended for the vessels to be used as commerce raiders to attack British merchant shipping. The first four vessels were traditional unprotected cruisers, but the naval engineer Louis-Émile Bertin successfully lobbied for the fifth vessel, which was to become Sfax, to be cancelled and redesigned to incorporate an armor deck to match the latest British protected cruisers. Since she was to attack merchant shipping during long cruises far from port, she was fitted with a barque sailing rig to supplement her steam engines. Sfax proved to be a successful design and created the basis from which the first generation of French protected cruisers would be built.

Sfax had a relatively uneventful career. She spent most of her career alternating between the Mediterranean, Northern, and Reserve Squadrons. During this period, she was primarily occupied with conducting training exercises with the rest of the French fleet. While in the Reserve Squadron, she was kept in commission for only part of the year. In 1895, Sfax was involved in an experimental bombardment of simulated fortifications that demonstrated the difficulty of suppressing prepared defenses. She briefly served on the North American station in 1899, but by 1901, had been reduced to reserve. She was struck from the naval register in 1906 and subsequently broken up.

Summary of the Sfax class
Ship	Armament	Displacement	Propulsion	Service		
Ship	Armament	Displacement	Propulsion	Laid down	Completed	Fate
Sfax	6 × 164 mm (6.5 in) guns	4,561 long tons (4,634 t)	2 × screw propellers 2 × compound steam engines 16.7 knots (30.9 km/h; 19.2 mph)	March 1882	June 1887	Broken up, 1906

== Tage ==
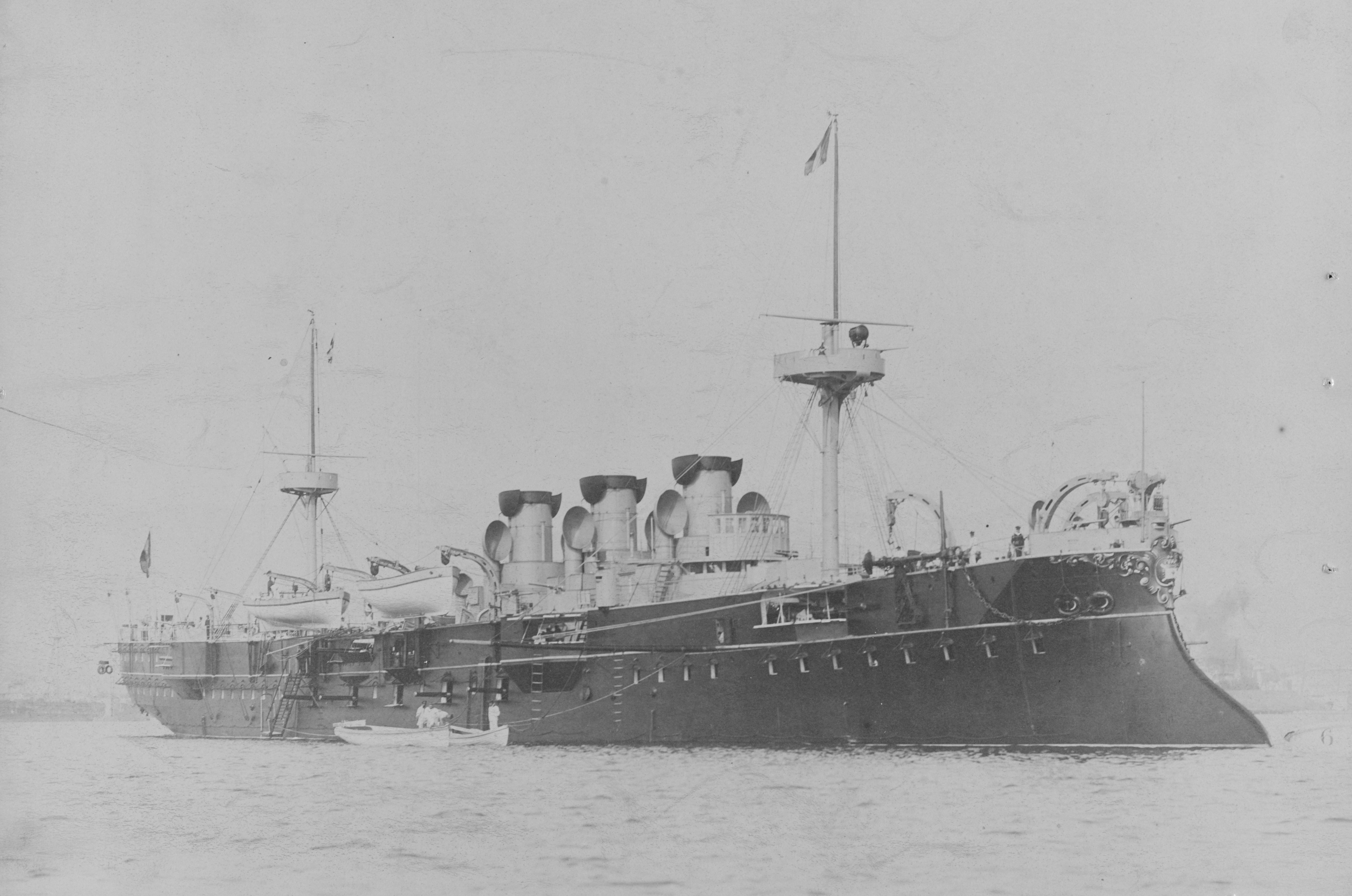
Tage early in her career

Tage was an enlarged version of Sfax ordered in 1885, the next vessel built under the 1878 construction program. She was more than fifty percent larger than her predecessor in terms of displacement; the increase in size was primarily used to install a significantly more powerful propulsion system and thereby attain a much higher speed, though she also carried an additional pair of main battery guns. Like Sfax, Tage was intended to operate as a commerce raider, and as such originally carried a barque sailing rig. She featured a tumblehome shape and a pronounced ram bow, which would become standard characteristics of French cruisers of the period.

The ship spent the 1890s operating in the Mediterranean Sea, either as part of the active Mediterranean or the Reserve Squadron, the latter being typically activated for annual training exercises with the rest of the fleet. The ship was modernized in 1900, which included the installation of new water-tube boilers, removal of her sailing rig, and other alterations. After returning to service, she operated with the Newfoundland and Iceland Naval Division beginning in 1902, and later the Atlantic Squadron the following year. Tage was ultimately struck from the naval register in 1910 and then broken up for scrap.

Summary of the Tage class
Ship	Armament	Displacement	Propulsion	Service		
Ship	Armament	Displacement	Propulsion	Laid down	Completed	Fate
Tage	8 × 164 mm guns	7,469 long tons (7,589 t)	2 × screw propellers 2 × triple-expansion steam engines 19.2 knots (35.6 km/h; 22.1 mph)	July 1885	December 1890	Broken up, 1910

== Amiral Cécille ==
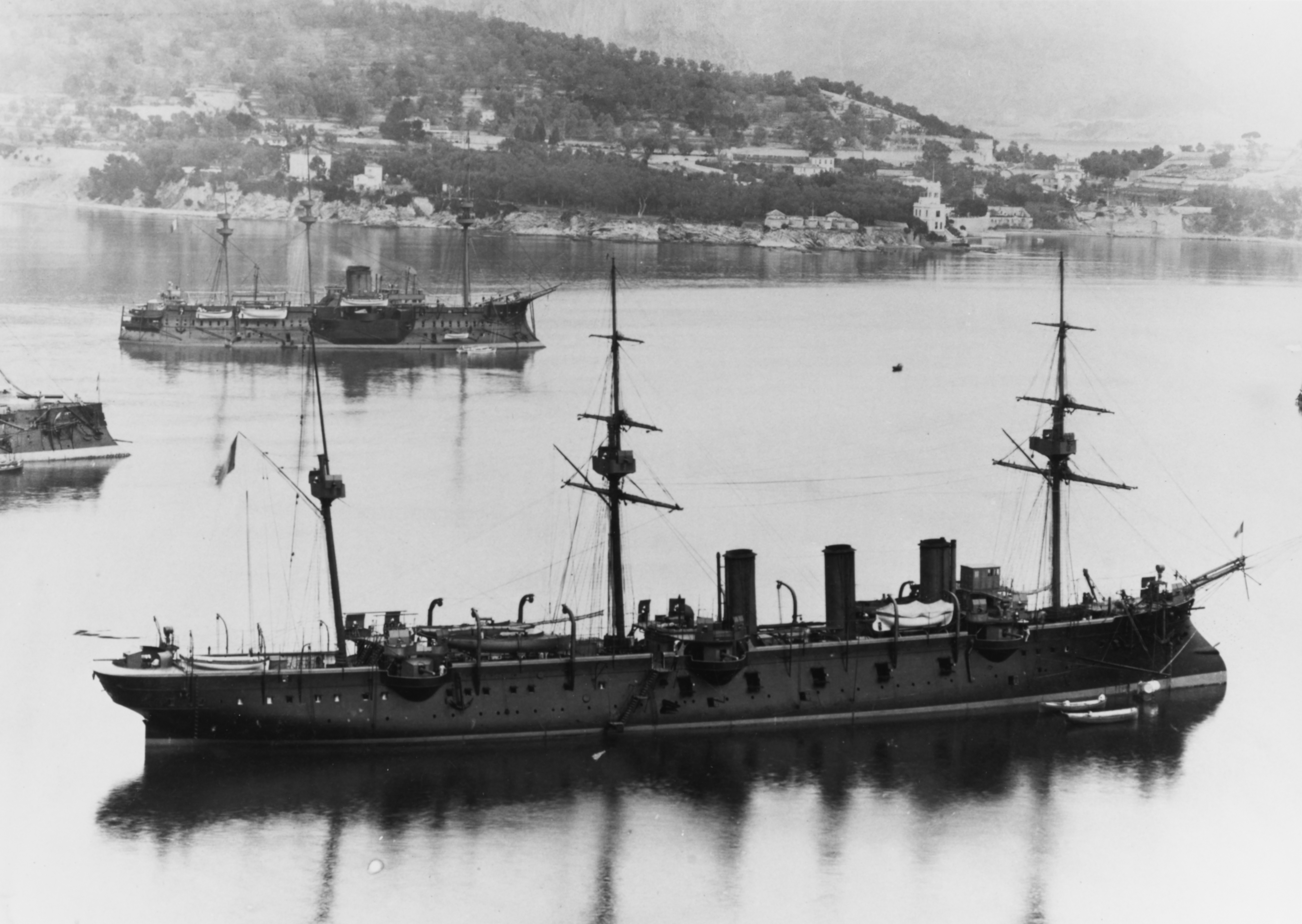
Amiral Cécille in Villefranche-sur-Mer in late 1890 or 1891

Amiral Cécille represented the third and final development of the basic Sfax design; she was in many respects a scaled-down version of Tage, though she was still larger than Sfax. She retained the same hull general hull shape, layout, barque sailing rig, and eight-gun main battery, but reverted to older compound engines. She nevertheless maintained a similar top speed to that of her predecessor.

Amiral Cécille spent the early 1890s with the main fleet in the Mediterranean Squadron, where she was primarily occupied with training exercises. After being overhauled in the mid-1890s, she was transferred to the Reserve Squadron in the Mediterranean, where she continued to participate in training maneuvers. The ship detached to join the Naval Division of the Atlantic Ocean in 1899, where she served for the next three years. Recalled home in 1902, she saw no further active service and she was hulked in 1907, before being broken up in 1919.

Summary of the Amiral Cécille class
Ship	Armament	Displacement	Propulsion	Service		
Ship	Armament	Displacement	Propulsion	Laid down	Completed	Fate
Amiral Cécille	8 × 164 mm guns	5,893 long tons (5,988 t)	2 × screw propellers compound steam engines 19.4 knots (35.9 km/h; 22.3 mph)	August 1886	September 1890	Broken up, 1919

== Davout ==
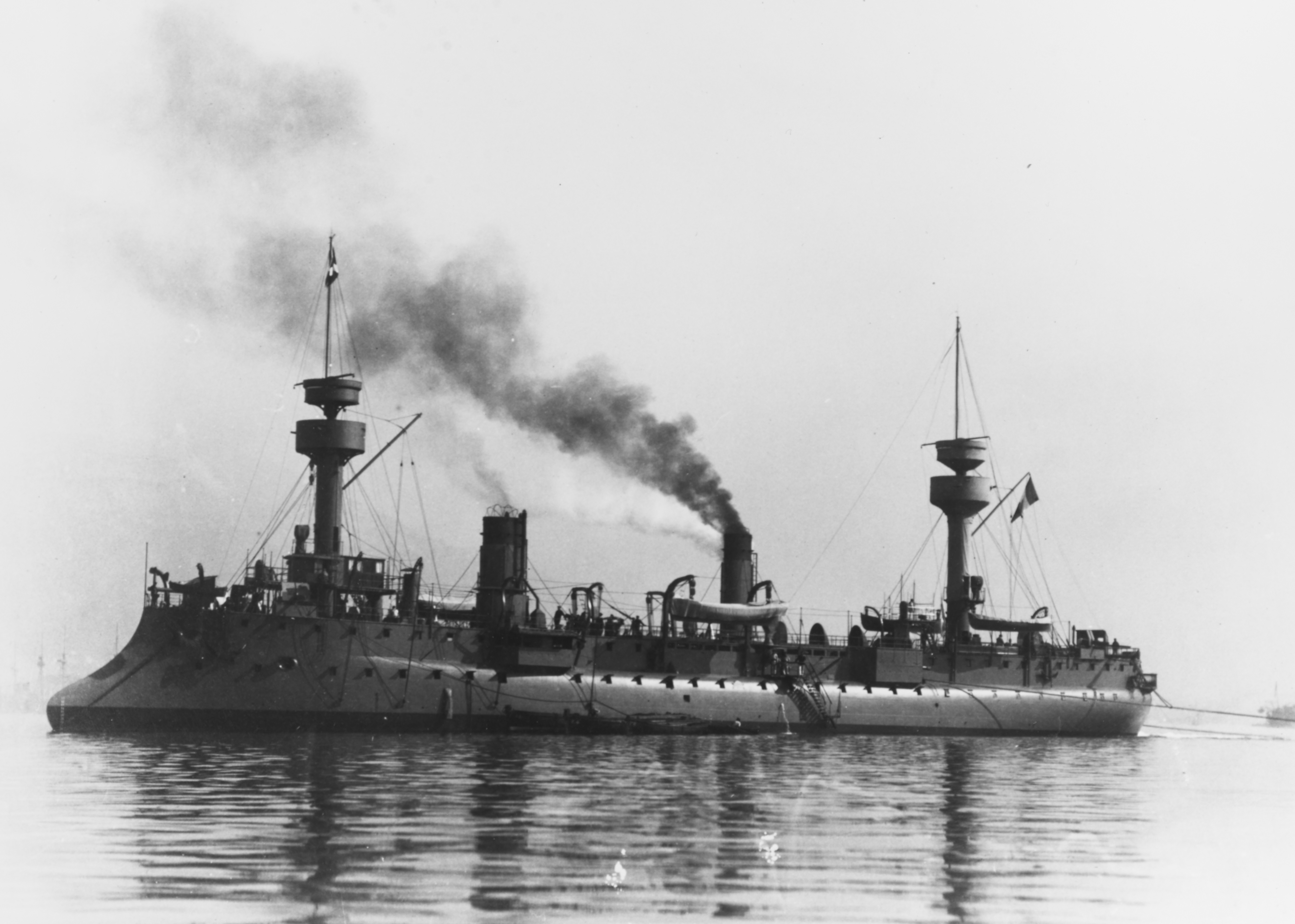
Davout shortly before her completion

In 1886, Admiral Théophile Aube became the French Minister of Marine. Aube was a proponent of the ideas of the Jeune École doctrine, which envisioned using a combination of cruisers and torpedo boats to defend France and attack enemy merchant shipping. His construction program mandated three more large cruisers similar to Sfax, Tage, and Amiral Cécille, six small cruisers, and two medium vessels. Davout was the first of the large vessels to be built; her design provided the basis for many of the later protected cruisers built by France.

Davout had a relatively uneventful career; her completion was delayed by two years due to problems with her propulsion system. After entering service in 1893, she was assigned to the Reserve Squadron, based in the Mediterranean Sea. The ship spent the rest of the decade operating either with the Reserve Squadron for training exercises or as part of the training unit of the French fleet. In 1899, she received a major overhaul that included the installation of new boilers, and in 1902, she was assigned to the North Atlantic station. By 1910, she had been struck from the naval register and was subsequently sold to ship breakers.

Summary of the Davout class
Ship	Armament	Displacement	Propulsion	Service		
Ship	Armament	Displacement	Propulsion	Laid down	Completed	Fate
Davout	6 × 164 mm guns	3,031 long tons (3,080 t)	2 × screw propellers 2 × triple-expansion steam engines 20.7 knots (38.3 km/h; 23.8 mph)	September 1887	1891	Broken up, 1910

== Suchet ==
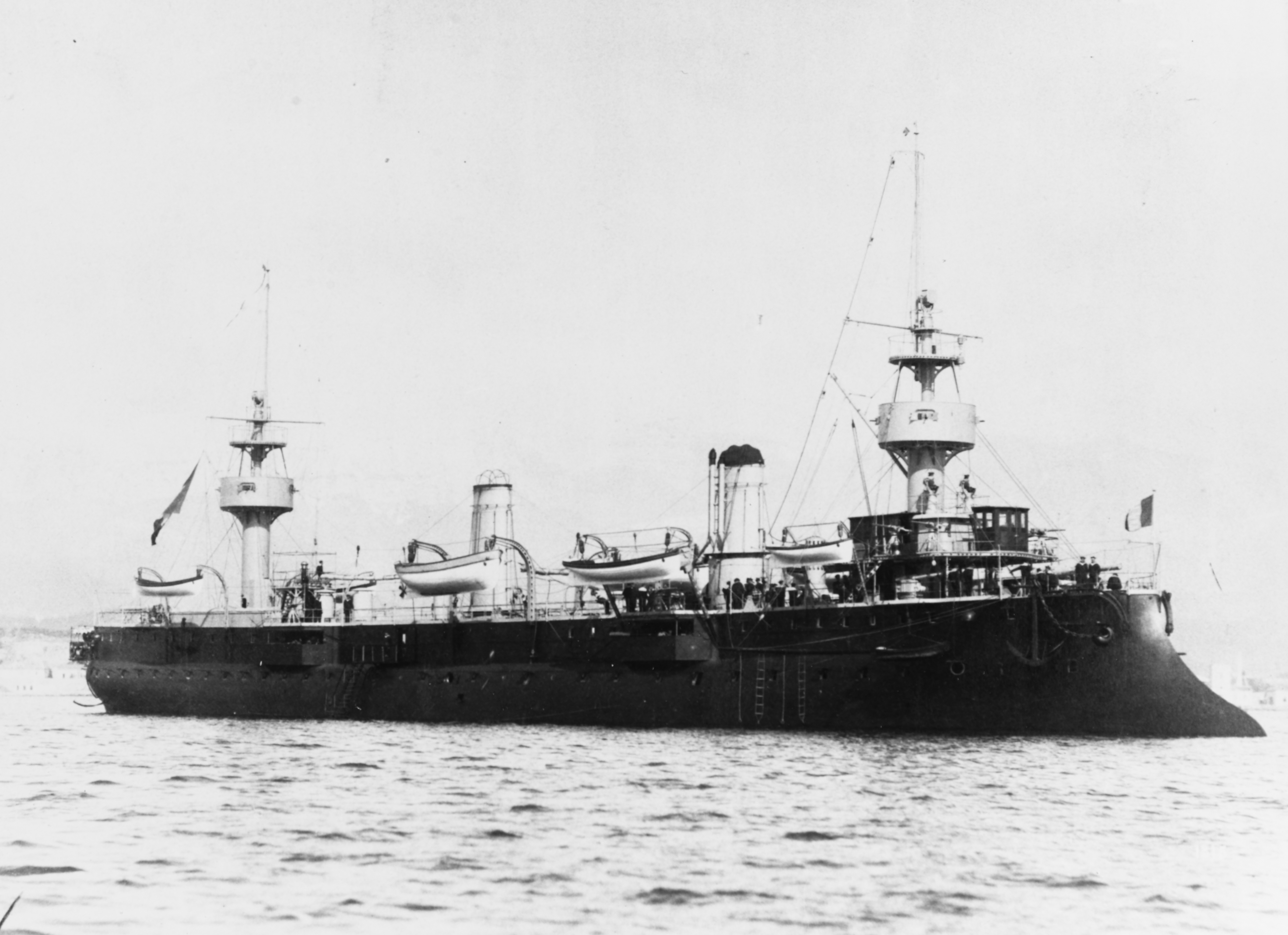
Suchet shortly after completion, c. 1895

Suchet was the second medium ship ordered by Aube; she was originally intended to be a sister ship to Davout, but during construction of that vessel, the design staff realized that the engines were not powerful enough to allow Davout to reach her intended speed. As a result, Suchet was lengthened to accommodate larger engines, since she was not in an advanced state of construction, though Davout could not be similarly modified. The two ships served as prototypes for the later Friant-class of cruisers, though additional lengthening was required to reach the desired speed.

After completing her sea trials in 1894, Suchet was assigned to the Mediterranean Squadron the next year. She took part in the opening ceremonies for the Bizerte Canal later that year. She continued to operate with the unit through early 1897, when she was sent to the Levant Division in the eastern Mediterranean. The ship was reassigned to the Naval Division of the Atlantic Ocean in 1900, and she was one of the first responders to the 1902 eruption of Mount Pelée in May, helping to rescue survivors from Saint-Pierre and its harbor, along with other towns on the island of Martinique. In total, she evacuated around 1,200 people to Fort-de-France. The next month, she was involved in a minor diplomatic incident with Venezuela, where six Frenchmen had been arrested; Suchet's intervention secured their release. The ship returned to France later in 1902, where she was placed in reserve. Struck from the naval register in 1906, Suchet was broken up for scrap.

Summary of the Suchet class
Ship	Armament	Displacement	Propulsion	Service		
Ship	Armament	Displacement	Propulsion	Laid down	Completed	Fate
Suchet	6 × 164 mm guns	3,362 long tons (3,416 t)	2 × screw propellers 2 × triple-expansion steam engines 20.4 knots (37.8 km/h; 23.5 mph)	October 1887	1894	Broken up, 1906

== Forbin class ==
Coëtlogon at anchor, date unknown

The three Forbin-class cruisers were the first small cruisers ordered under Aube's construction program, though their development predated his tenure as naval minister. The Conseil des Travaux had requested a new design for fast scouts for the ironclad battleships of the main fleet. They specified a displacement of around 2,000 long tons (2,032 t) in 1879, which resulted in the final French unprotected cruiser, Milan. That vessel, designed by Louis-Émile Bertin, provided the basis for an improved version that incorporated an armor deck, heavier armament, and higher top speed.

Forbin spent most of her career in the Mediterranean in the Reserve Squadron, while Surcouf served in the Northern Squadron in the English Channel. Coëtlogon suffered from machinery problems that significantly delayed her completion, and after finally entering service in 1894, joined Surcouf in the Northern Squadron. All three ships were in reserve by 1901. Coëtlogon was discarded in 1906, while Forbin was converted into a collier in 1913. Surcouf was the only member of the class still in active service during World War I, and she was deployed later in the conflict to the Gulf of Guinea. Forbin and Surcouf were both sold to ship breakers in 1921.

Summary of the Forbin class
Ship	Armament	Displacement	Propulsion	Service		
Ship	Armament	Displacement	Propulsion	Laid down	Completed	Fate
Forbin	4 × 138 mm (5.4 in) guns	1,901–2,012 long tons (1,932–2,044 t)	2 × screw propellers compound steam engines 20 to 20.5 knots (37.0 to 38.0 km/h; 23.0 to 23.6 mph)	May 1886	February 1889	Broken up, 1921
Coëtlogon	4 × 138 mm (5.4 in) guns	1,901–2,012 long tons (1,932–2,044 t)	2 × screw propellers compound steam engines 20 to 20.5 knots (37.0 to 38.0 km/h; 23.0 to 23.6 mph)	May 1886	1890	Broken up, 1921
Surcouf	4 × 138 mm (5.4 in) guns	1,901–2,012 long tons (1,932–2,044 t)	2 × screw propellers compound steam engines 20 to 20.5 knots (37.0 to 38.0 km/h; 23.0 to 23.6 mph)	1887	August 1894	Broken up, 1906

== Troude class ==
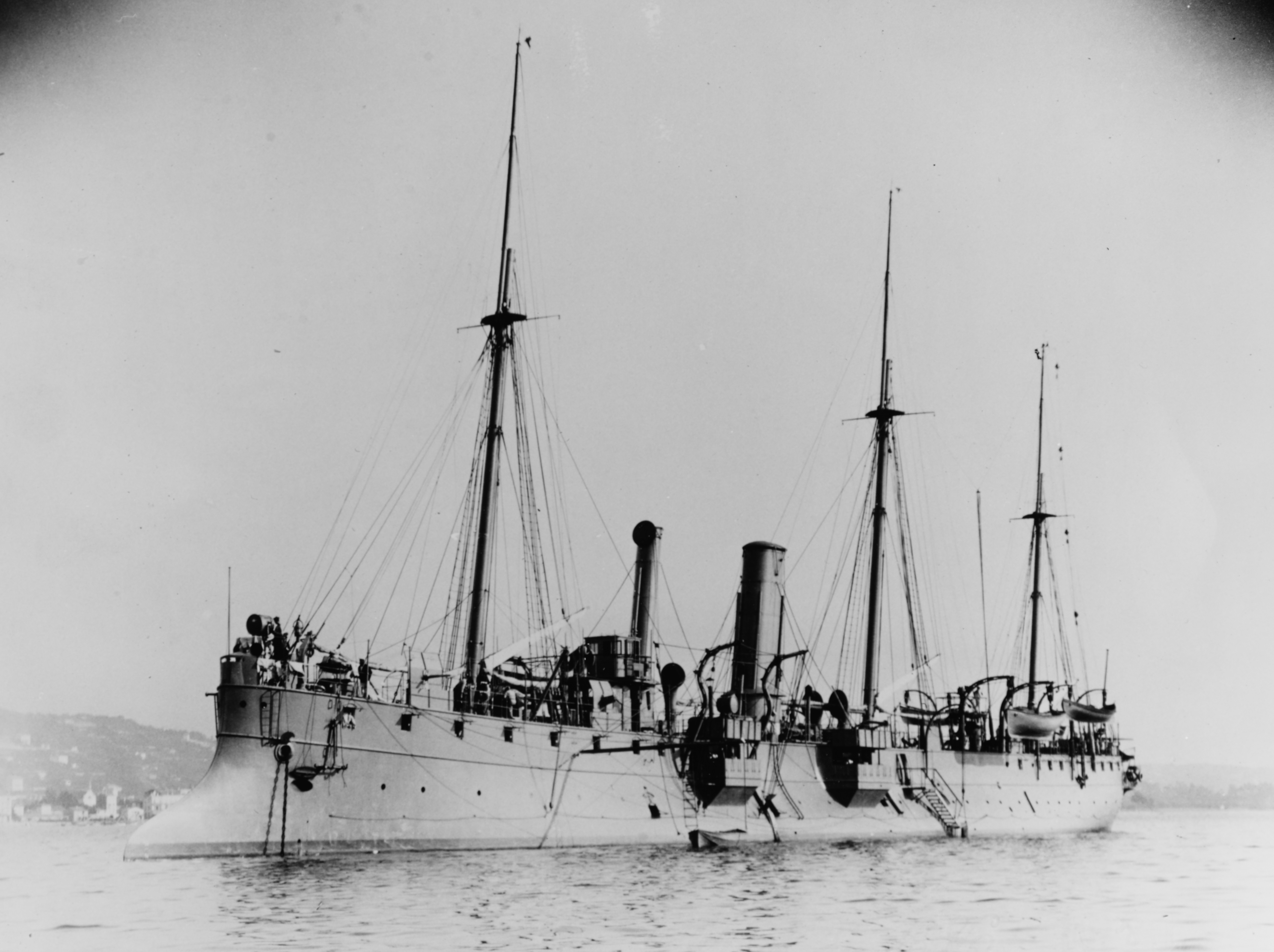
Lalande in the early 1890s

The three Troude-class cruisers, which were an iterative development of the Forbin design, completed the requirement for six fleet scouts under Aube's program. The two classes were broadly identical, being generally the same size, carrying the same armament, and having the same maximum speed. Minor alterations included a relocation of the main battery sponsons and the addition of armor plate to the main conning tower.

All three members of the class served in the Mediterranean Squadron in their early careers, where they took part in routine training exercises. In 1897, Troude became the flagship of the Levant Division, and was later transferred to the North Atlantic Division in 1899. All three ships were in reserve by 1901. Troude was reactivated for a brief stint in the North Atlantic from 1904 to 1905, while Lalande returned to service in the Mediterranean in 1906. Troude was discarded in 1907 or 1908 and Lalande was broken up for scrap in 1912. Cosmao remained in reserve until the start of World War I in August 1914, when she was recommissioned to patrol the coast of French Morocco. She, too, was scrapped after the war in 1922.

Summary of the Troude class
Ship	Armament	Displacement	Propulsion	Service		
Ship	Armament	Displacement	Propulsion	Laid down	Completed	Fate
Troude	4 × 138 mm guns	1,923–1,994 long tons (1,954–2,026 t)	2 × screw propellers compound steam engines 20.5 kn	November 1886	January 1891	Broken up, 1907 or 1908
Lalande	4 × 138 mm guns	1,923–1,994 long tons (1,954–2,026 t)	2 × screw propellers compound steam engines 20.5 kn	1887	October 1890	Broken up, 1912
Cosmao	4 × 138 mm guns	1,923–1,994 long tons (1,954–2,026 t)	2 × screw propellers compound steam engines 20.5 kn	1887	1891	Broken up, 1922

== Jean Bart class ==
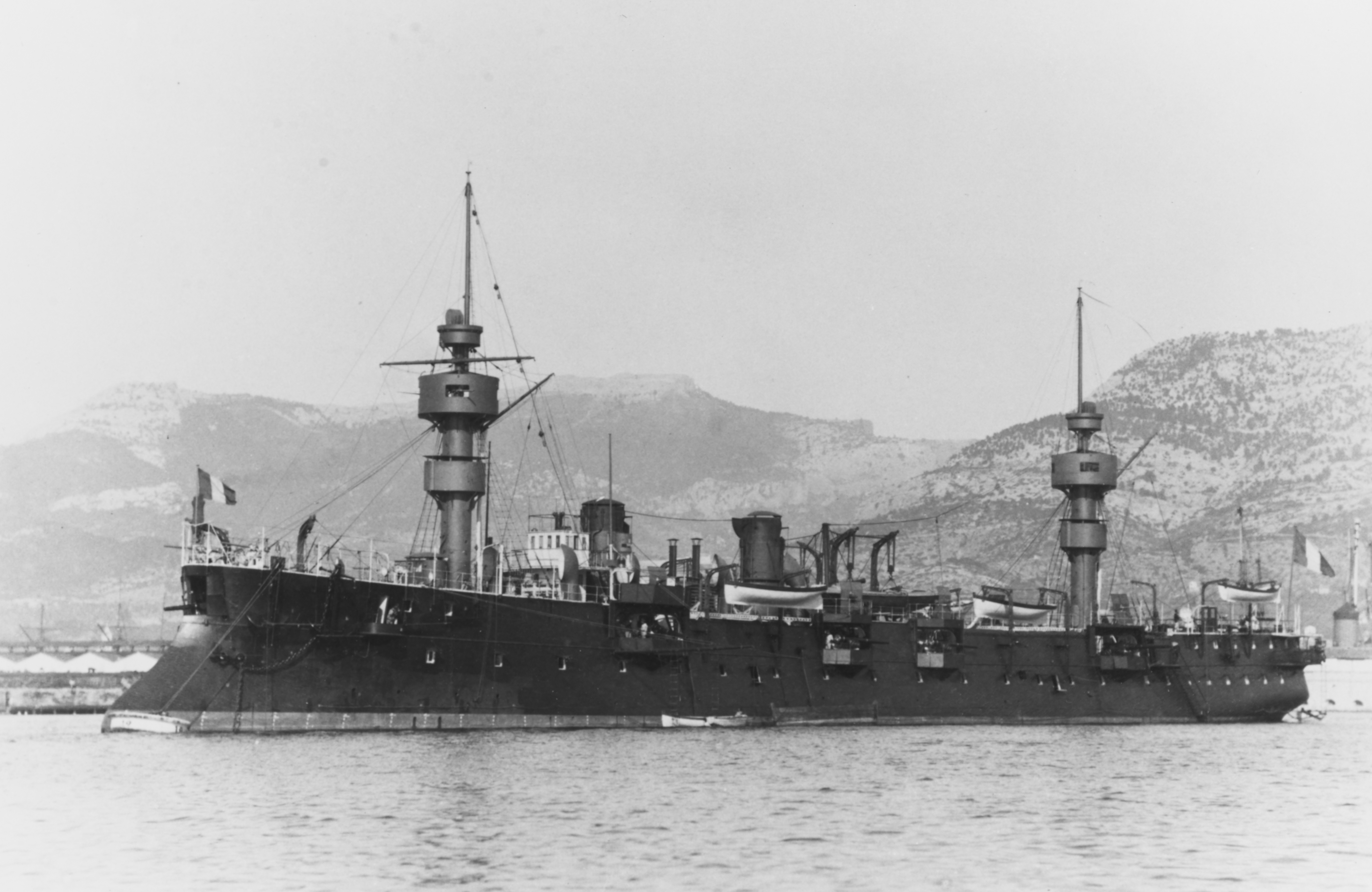
Jean Bart early in her career

Two of the last vessels to be ordered during Aube's tenure as naval minister, design work on the two Jean Bart-class vessels began under his predecessor, Charles-Eugène Galiber, who requested a scaled down version of Amiral Cécille. The chief alteration was the substitution of a smaller number of secondary battery guns in flexible sponsons for the larger number of guns in a fixed central battery. During the design process, the Conseil examined several proposals and ultimately selected two; the first became Jean Bart, and the second became the similar cruiser Alger. Because they were designed at the same time and were broadly similar in their characteristics, the two designs are sometimes referred to as a single class. The orders for both ships, along with a second member of the Jean Bart class, were placed by Aube and fulfilled his requirement for the three medium cruisers in his program. They proved to be the last of the larger commerce raiding cruisers ordered by Aube, though the French Navy would later return to the idea with Guichen and Châteaurenault in the late 1890s.

After entering service, Isly was assigned to the Northern Squadron, while Jean Bart operated with the Mediterranean Squadron until 1895, when she, too, joined the Northern Squadron. That year, Isly was sent to French Indochina, and they were followed by Jean Bart in 1898. Jean Bart was present in the Far East during the Boxer Uprising in Qing China the following year, by which time Isly had been transferred to the North Atlantic station. Jean Bart was wrecked off the coast of the Western Sahara in 1907 and could not be refloated. Isly was converted into a depot ship in 1909 and Alger was hulked in 1911; the former was sold to ship breakers in 1914.

Summary of the Jean Bart class
Ship	Armament	Displacement	Propulsion	Service		
Ship	Armament	Displacement	Propulsion	Laid down	Completed	Fate
Jean Bart	4 × 164 mm guns	4,313 long tons (4,382 t)	2 × screw propellers 2 × triple-expansion steam engines 19 to 19.5 knots (35.2 to 36.1 km/h; 21.9 to 22.4 mph)	September 1887	1891	Wrecked, 1907
Isly	4 × 164 mm guns	4,313 long tons (4,382 t)	2 × screw propellers 2 × triple-expansion steam engines 19 to 19.5 knots (35.2 to 36.1 km/h; 21.9 to 22.4 mph)	August 1887	1893	Broken up, 1914

== Alger ==
Alger early in her career

The design for Alger was prepared during the same process that led to the construction of the Jean Bart class; eight proposals had been submitted to meet Galiber's requirements and the Conseil ultimately selected two, which became Jean Bart and Alger. The designs were broadly similar in size and armament, and differed primarily in their propulsion system. Jean Bart employed older fire-tube boilers, while Alger adopted the new water-tube boilers that had been successfully used aboard the unprotected cruiser Milan. After both ships entered service, the French determined that the Jean Bart hull design was superior to Alger's.

After entering service, Alger was assigned to the Northern Squadron until 1895, when she was sent to French Indochina, By 1898, Alger had returned to France to serve in the Mediterranean. Alger embarked on a second tour in East Asia in the mid-1900s, though records of when she left France are unclear. After returning to France, the ship was decommissioned in October 1910 and struck from the naval register in 1911. She was used as a hulk for various purposes from 1912 to 1939, before ultimately being sold to ship breakers in 1940.

Summary of the Alger class
Ship	Armament	Displacement	Propulsion	Service		
Ship	Armament	Displacement	Propulsion	Laid down	Completed	Fate
Alger	4 × 164 mm guns	4,313 long tons (4,382 t)	2 × screw propellers 2 × triple-expansion steam engines 19 to 19.5 knots (35.2 to 36.1 km/h; 21.9 to 22.4 mph)	November 1887	1891	Broken up, 1939

== Friant class ==
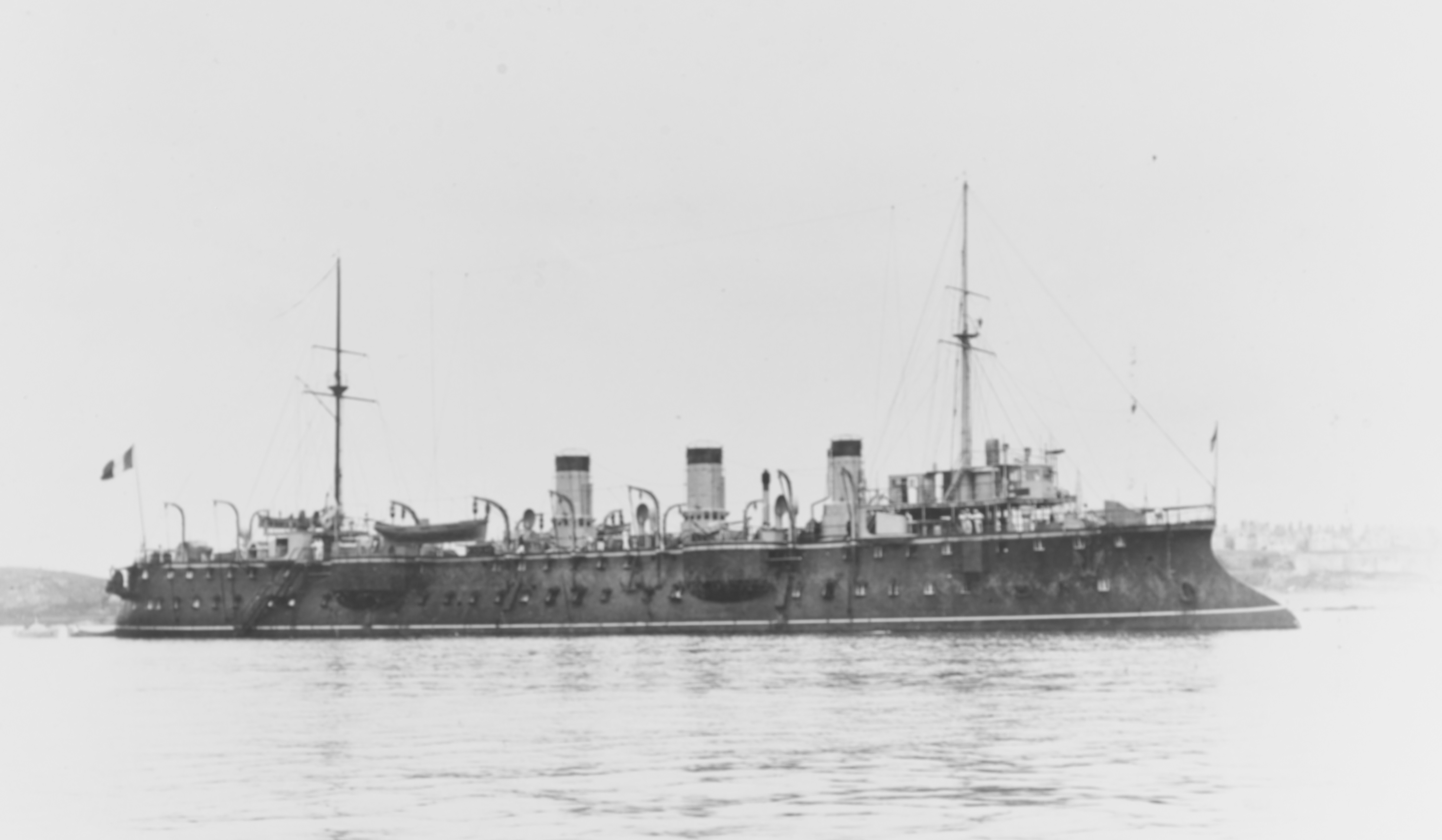
Friant in port, lightly loaded

By the late 1880s, the French Navy had come to regard Italy and its ally Germany as a more pressing threat than France's traditional rival, Great Britain. As a result of a major increase in tensions between France and Italy in the 1880s, the French Navy embarked on a major construction program in 1890 that included a total of seventy new cruisers to strengthen the main fleet and the forces available for deployment in the French colonial empire. The Friant class was the first group to be authorized under the new program, and their design was based on that of Davout and Suchet, albeit with significant modifications.

Friant and Chasseloup-Laubaut initially served with the Northern Squadron, while Bugeaud operated in the Mediterranean Squadron. Bugeaud became the flagship of the Levant Division in 1898, which operated as part of the International Squadron that intervened in the Cretan Revolt of 1897–1898. All three members of the class were sent to East Asia in response to the Boxer Uprising by 1901, and they remained in the region through the mid-1900s. Bugeaud was badly worn out by her time in the Far East, and she was sold for scrap in 1907. That year, Chasseloup-Laubat visited the United States during the Jamestown Exposition.

Chasseloup-Laubat was reduced to a storage hulk in 1911, but Friant remained in active service through the start of World War I in August 1914. She operated with cruiser squadrons patrolling for German commerce raiders early in the war and was later sent to patrol the formerly-German colony of Kamerun. Chasseloup-Laubat was converted into a distilling ship to support the main French fleet at Corfu while Friant ended the war having been rebuilt into a repair ship. The latter vessel was sold for scrap in 1920, while Chasseloup-Laubat ultimately foundered in 1926 after having been abandoned in the Bay of Nouadhibou, French Mauritania.

Summary of the Friant class
Ship	Armament	Displacement	Propulsion	Service		
Ship	Armament	Displacement	Propulsion	Laid down	Completed	Fate
Friant	6 × 164 mm guns	3,809–3,982 long tons (3,870–4,046 t)	2 × screw propellers 2 × triple-expansion steam engines 18.7 knots (34.6 km/h; 21.5 mph)	1891	April 1895	Broken up, 1920
Bugeaud	6 × 164 mm guns	3,809–3,982 long tons (3,870–4,046 t)	2 × screw propellers 2 × triple-expansion steam engines 18.7 knots (34.6 km/h; 21.5 mph)	June 1891	May 1896	Broken up, 1907
Chasseloup-Laubat	6 × 164 mm guns	3,809–3,982 long tons (3,870–4,046 t)	2 × screw propellers 2 × triple-expansion steam engines 18.7 knots (34.6 km/h; 21.5 mph)	June 1891	1895	Abandoned and foundered, 1926

== Linois class ==
Linois early in her career, before 1898

The Linois-class cruisers were ordered under the same construction program, and they were an improvement upon the Troude design, the primary improvement being an increased freeboard for better seakeeping. They also featured a strengthened armament with more modern, quick-firing guns for the main battery, additional light guns for close-range defense, and more powerful torpedo tubes. They proved to be the last of the small, 2,000-ton cruisers built for the French fleet.

All three members of the class served with the Mediterranean Squadron upon entering service in the mid-to-late 1890s. During this period, they were primarily occupied with peacetime training maneuvers. Lavoisier was transferred to the Newfoundland and Iceland Naval Division in 1903, where she patrolled fisheries for the next decade. After uneventful careers, Linois and Galilée were discarded in 1910 and 1911, respectively, having spent less than fifteen years in service. Lavoisier was the only member of the class still in commission at the start of World War I in August 1914. She was used to patrol for German warships and submarines in various secondary theaters, ending the war in the Syrian Naval Division, where she remained through 1918. She was ultimately struck from the naval register in 1920 and thereafter broken up.

Summary of the Linois class
Ship	Armament	Displacement	Propulsion	Service		
Ship	Armament	Displacement	Propulsion	Laid down	Completed	Fate
Linois	4 × 138 mm guns	2,285–2,318 long tons (2,322–2,355 t)	2 × screw propellers 2 × triple-expansion steam engines 20.5 knots	August 1892	1895	Broken up, 1910
Galilée	4 × 138 mm guns	2,285–2,318 long tons (2,322–2,355 t)	2 × screw propellers 2 × triple-expansion steam engines 20.5 knots	1893	September 1897	Broken up, 1911
Lavoisier	4 × 138 mm guns	2,285–2,318 long tons (2,322–2,355 t)	2 × screw propellers 2 × triple-expansion steam engines 20.5 knots	January 1895	April 1898	Broken up, 1920

== Descartes class ==
Pascal, c. 1897–1900

The Descartes class, also ordered under the 1890 program, marked a break from previous French cruiser designs, which traced their origin to either Davout or Milan. They nevertheless featured many of the characteristics of earlier vessels, including a tumblehome hull, ram bow, and armament carried in sponsons. The ships were fitted with wood and copper sheathing to protect their hull on extended voyages overseas, improving their suitability for use in the French colonies.

Descartes and Pascal were initially sent to French Indochina in the late 1890s, where they participated in the campaign to suppress the Boxer Uprising. Descartes was recalled to France in 1902 to serve in the Atlantic Division, while Pascal remained in East Asia, serving until 1904 when she was deactivated due to poor condition. Descartes was sent back to East Asia in 1905 and later to French Madagascar before returning to France in 1907, thereafter serving with the main French fleets in the Mediterranean Sea and English Channel. Pascal was sold to ship breakers in 1911, while Descartes served another stint in the Atlantic Division. She remained there during the first three years of World War I before returning to France in 1917, where she was disarmed and decommissioned. She was struck from the naval register in 1920, but her ultimate fate is unknown.

Summary of the Descartes class
Ship	Armament	Displacement	Propulsion	Service		
Ship	Armament	Displacement	Propulsion	Laid down	Completed	Fate
Descartes	4 × 164 mm guns	3,960 long tons (4,020 t)	2 × screw propellers 2 × triple-expansion steam engines 19.5 knots	August 1892	July 1896	Discarded, 1920
Pascal	4 × 164 mm guns	3,960 long tons (4,020 t)	2 × screw propellers 2 × triple-expansion steam engines 19.5 knots	December 1893	1897	Broken up, 1911

== D'Assas class ==
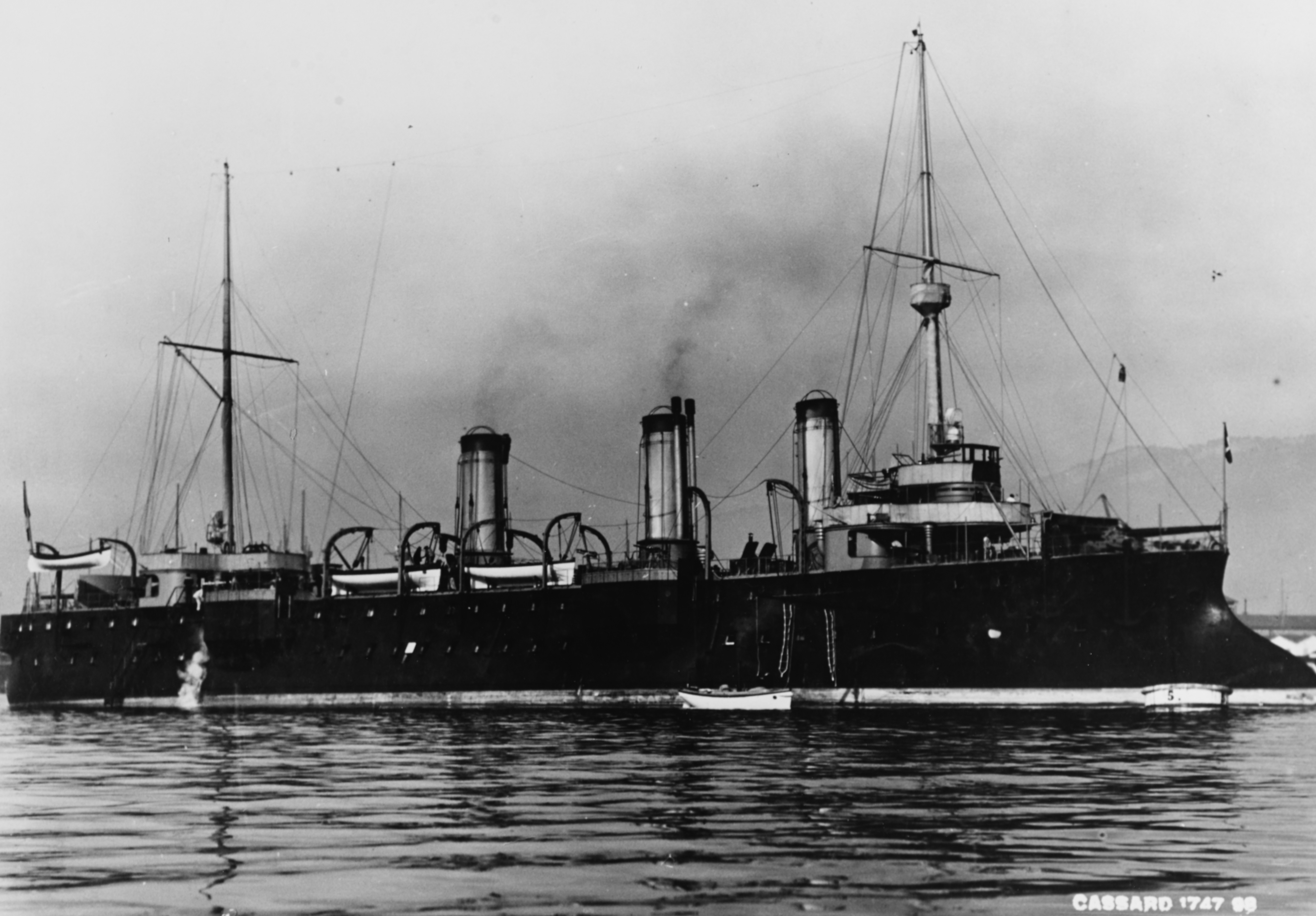
Cassard, date unknown

The D'Assas class was an improvement over the Friant design; they carried the same armament on the same size hull, but with improved armor protection. All three ships began service in the Mediterranean Squadron in the late 1890s, though D'Assas was later transferred to the Northern Squadron in 1901 and then to French Indochina in 1904. Du Chayla supported an amphibious landing in French Morocco in 1907 and Cassard joined her there the following year. D'Assas was discarded in 1914, but the other two members of the class saw service during World War I, primarily patrolling the Atlantic for German commerce raiders. Both ships were partially disarmed late in the conflict and Cassard became a gunnery training ship while Du Chayla remained in active service. She took part in the Allied intervention in the Russian Civil War in 1919 before being stricken from the register in 1921, while Cassard lingered on in service until 1924, when she was also stricken. Cassard was sold for scrap the following year and Du Chayla was eventually scrapped in 1933.

Summary of the D'Assas class
Ship	Armament	Displacement	Propulsion	Service		
Ship	Armament	Displacement	Propulsion	Laid down	Completed	Fate
D'Assas	6 × 164 mm guns	3,962 long tons (4,026 t)	2 × screw propellers 2 × triple-expansion steam engines 20 knots	1894	March 1898	Broken up, 1914
Cassard	6 × 164 mm guns	3,962 long tons (4,026 t)	2 × screw propellers 2 × triple-expansion steam engines 20 knots	1894	February 1898	Broken up, 1925
Du Chayla	6 × 164 mm guns	3,962 long tons (4,026 t)	2 × screw propellers 2 × triple-expansion steam engines 20 knots	March 1894	February 1898	Broken up, 1933

== Catinat class ==
Catinat, date unknown

The two Catinat-class cruisers were derivatives of the Descartes design, with some alterations to the layout of the armament, a slight reduction in the thickness of the armor deck, and equipment to carry and lay fifty naval mines. They were otherwise very similar, carrying the same armament and propulsion system. Like the Descartes-class ships, they were intended to serve in the colonies.

Catinat served briefly with the Northern Squadron in 1898 and 1899 before being placed in reserve; thereafter, she and Protet served the entirety of their active careers abroad. Protet was sent to the Pacific in 1899 after being completed, and she remained there through 1905 to protect French interests. Catinat was sent on a brief stint to French Madagascar in 1901 through at least 1902, before returning to France at some point before 1905. Early that year, she was sent to the Pacific to replace her sister ship, remaining there through at least 1908. No records of her activities thereafter survive. That year, Protet was converted into a training ship for the Gunnery School, though she was sold for scrap in 1910. Catinat was discarded the following year.

Summary of the Catinat class
Ship	Armament	Displacement	Propulsion	Service		
Ship	Armament	Displacement	Propulsion	Laid down	Completed	Fate
Catinat	4 × 164 mm guns	4,001–4,048 long tons (4,065–4,113 t)	2 × screw propellers 2 × triple-expansion steam engines 19.5 to 20 knots	February 1894	1898	Broken up, 1911
Protet	4 × 164 mm guns	4,001–4,048 long tons (4,065–4,113 t)	2 × screw propellers 2 × triple-expansion steam engines 19.5 to 20 knots	March 1896	February 1899	Broken up, 1910

== D'Entrecasteaux ==
D'Entrecasteaux underway during sea trials in 1898

Through the 1880s and early 1890s, arguments continued about the types of cruisers that should be built. Traditionalist officers preferred armored cruisers and small scouts like the Forbin and Troude classes suited to fleet operations, while advocates of the Jeune École pressed for more large, long-range commerce raiders like those that had been ordered by Aube. A third faction sought vessels that could be used to patrol the French colonial empire. The acquisition of French Indochina during this period gave leverage to the latter group, who secured approval for a large protected cruiser that was to serve as the flagship of a new cruiser squadron that would be permanently based there. The new vessel, which became D'Entrecasteaux, was armed with a main battery of two 240 mm (9.4 in) guns, the largest weapons ever mounted on any French cruiser.

D'Entrecasteaux spent much of her early career in French Indochina, serving there from 1900 to 1903, and then from 1905 to 1909. During this period, she saw action in the Boxer Uprising. She was modernized between 1909 and 1912, thereafter being used as a training ship until the start of World War I. The ship was deployed to the eastern Mediterranean, helping to defend the Suez Canal in early 1915 and bombarding Ottoman forces through early 1916. She served in a variety of theaters thereafter, but saw no further action. After the war, the ship was loaned to the Belgian Navy for use as a depot ship until 1926. She was then sold to the Polish Navy the following year, renamed Król Władysław IV and then Bałtyk, and was used as a stationary training vessel until the start of World War II in September 1940. The ship was damaged by German dive bombers, seized by the Germans, and later scrapped.

Summary of the D'Entrecasteaux class
Ship	Armament	Displacement	Propulsion	Service		
Ship	Armament	Displacement	Propulsion	Laid down	Completed	Fate
D'Entrecasteaux	2 × 240 mm (9.4 in) guns	7,995 long tons (8,123 t)	2 × screw propellers 2 × triple-expansion steam engines 19.2 knots (35.6 km/h; 22.1 mph)	September 1894	1899	Broken up, 1942

== Guichen ==
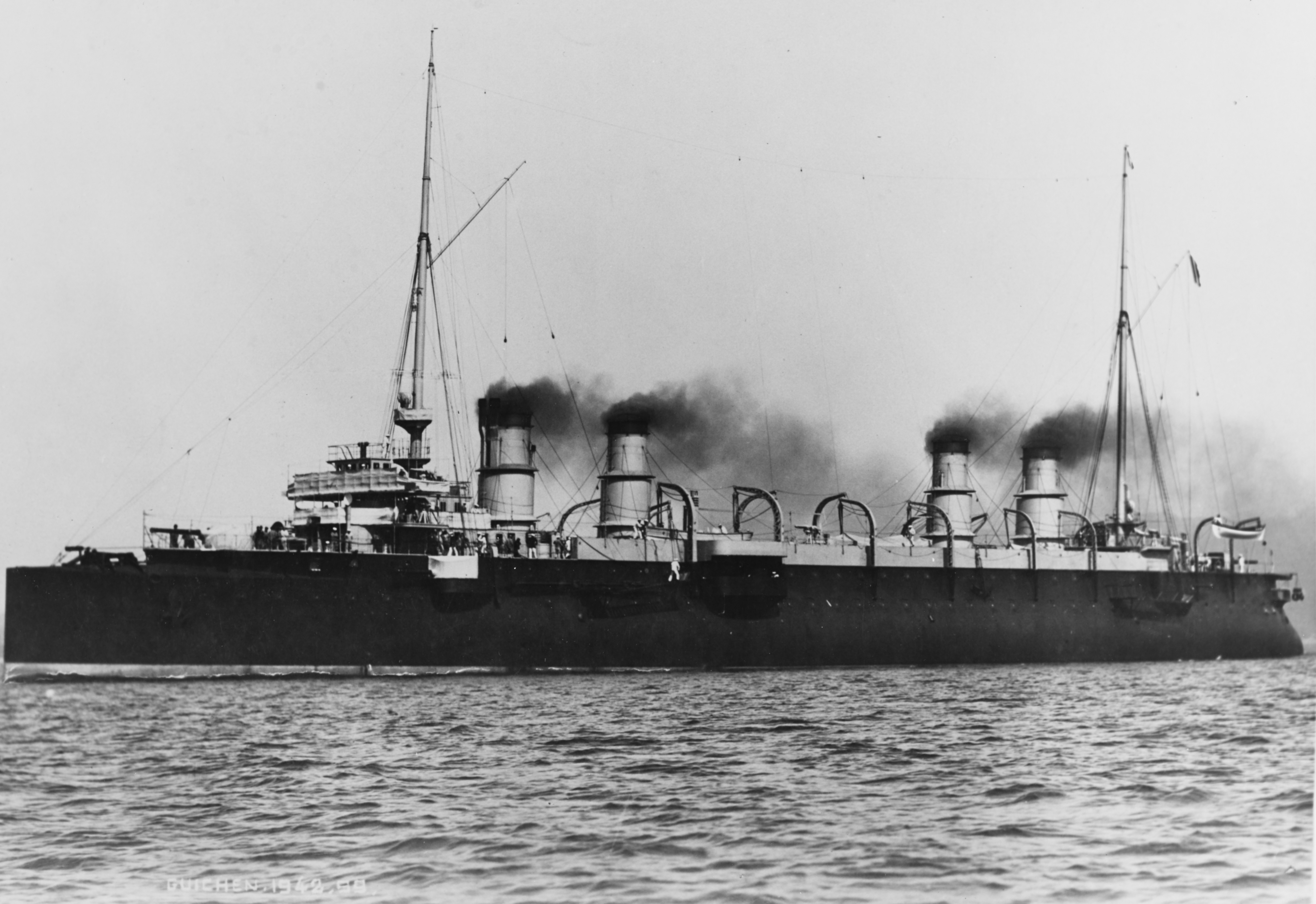
Guichen, date unknown

The proponents of the Jeune École secured approval for another pair of large cruisers, the first of which became Guichen. These new vessels were intended to serve as long-range commerce raiders, and their design was based on the United States Navy's Columbia-class cruisers. Both ships were intended to resemble passenger liners, which would help them evade discovery while conducting commerce raiding operations. Because she was meant to attack unarmed merchant shipping, Guichen carried a very weak armament for her size.

Guichen initially served with the Mediterranean Squadron during her lengthy sea trials, followed by a stint in the Northern Squadron. She was sent to the Far East in response to the Boxer Uprising by early 1901, returning to France the following year. Another deployment to East Asian waters came in 1905 and ended in 1907 with her return to France. She had been reduced to reserve by 1911 and saw little further activity until the start of World War I in July 1914. Guichen was mobilized into the 2nd Light Squadron and tasked with patrolling the western end of the English Channel. Guichen was transferred to the Mediterranean Sea in May 1915, serving initially with the main French fleet that blockaded the Austro-Hungarian Navy in the Adriatic Sea. Later in the year, she was reassigned to the Syrian Division that patrolled the coast of Ottoman Syria, where she helped to evacuate some 4,000 Armenian civilians fleeing the Armenian genocide. By 1917, she had been reduced to a fast transport operating between Italy and Greece. After the war, she took part in the Allied intervention in the Russian Civil War in the Black Sea, but after her crew mutinied in 1919, she was recalled to France, where she was eventually struck from the naval register in 1921 and broken up.

Summary of the Guichen class
Ship	Armament	Displacement	Propulsion	Service		
Ship	Armament	Displacement	Propulsion	Laid down	Completed	Fate
Guichen	2 × 164 mm guns	8,151 long tons (8,282 t)	3 × screw propellers 3 × triple-expansion steam engines 23.5 knots (43.5 km/h; 27.0 mph)	October 1895	November 1899	Broken up, 1921

== Châteaurenault ==
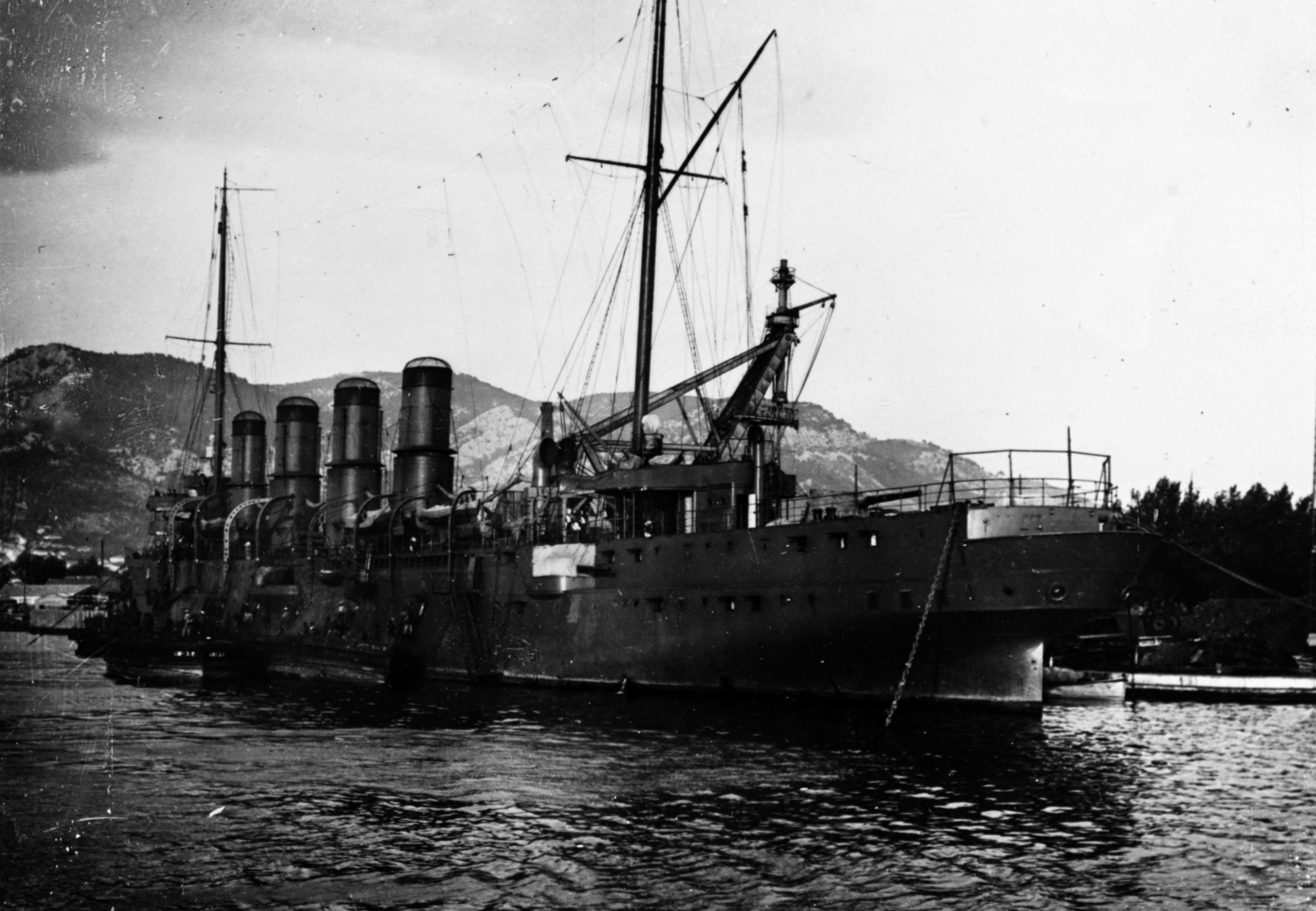
Châteaurenault coaling in Toulon during World War I

Châteaurenault was the second large commerce raider ordered in 1894; in most respects she was very similar to Guichen, though she differed markedly in appearance. She was slightly faster than Guichen, and the French Navy considered her to be a better steamer. Châteaurenault spent much of her early career overseas in French Indochina, deploying there immediately after her commissioning in 1902 through mid 1904, and then again in 1905–1906. She was reduced to reserve in 1907 and then modified to serve as a fast minelayer the following year. She was assigned to the Reserve Division of the Mediterranean Squadron. She saw little further activity until the outbreak of World War I in July 1914. The ship was mobilized into the 2nd Light Squadron and based in the western English Channel. She was moved to the Mediterranean Sea in early 1915 and then to French Senegal to search for German commerce raiders in early 1916. Having been transferred back to the Mediterranean by October 1916, she rescued survivors from the troopship SS Gallia that had been sunk by a German U-boat. Châteaurenault was herself torpedoed and sunk in December 1917, but she sank slowly enough for her crew to be taken off by a pair of destroyers, which in turn sank the German submarine.

Summary of the Châteaurenault class
Ship	Armament	Displacement	Propulsion	Service		
Ship	Armament	Displacement	Propulsion	Laid down	Completed	Fate
Châteaurenault	2 × 164 mm guns	7,898 long tons (8,025 t)	3 × screw propellers 3 × triple-expansion steam engines 24 knots (44 km/h; 28 mph)	May 1896	1902	Sunk, 14 December 1917

== D'Estrées class ==
Infernet, date unknown

The D'Estrées class was ordered to supplement the vessels available for service in the colonies. Two ships were initially authorized in 1896 and a third followed in 1897, though that vessel was ultimately not built. They were significantly smaller than earlier colonial cruisers and they carried a much lighter armament. The D'Estrées class proved to be the final protected cruiser design built for overseas service, as the French Navy transitioned to more powerful armored cruisers for that role in the late 1890s.

D'Estrées and Infernet initially served in the Northern Squadron after entering service in the late 1890s, though they were quickly transferred elsewhere. D'Estrées went to the Atlantic station in 1902, while Infernet had been sent to French Madagascar by 1901. The latter ship then served a stint in the East Indies from 1903 to 1905, thereafter returning to France, where she was lost in an accidental grounding in 1910. D'Estrées was assigned to the 2nd Light Division at the start of World War I in August 1914, before being moved to the Syrian Division. There, she took part in operations against Ottoman forces ashore. She patrolled the Red Sea and Indian Ocean from 1916 to the end of the war in 1918. D'Estrées was then sent to East Asia, where she served until being discarded in 1922.

Summary of the D'Estrées class
Ship	Armament	Displacement	Propulsion	Service		
Ship	Armament	Displacement	Propulsion	Laid down	Completed	Fate
D'Estrées	2 × 138 mm guns	2,428 long tons (2,467 t)	2 × screw propellers 2 × triple-expansion steam engines 20 to 20.5 knots	March 1897	1899	Broken up, 1924
Infernet	2 × 138 mm guns	2,428 long tons (2,467 t)	2 × screw propellers 2 × triple-expansion steam engines 20 to 20.5 knots	December 1896	1900	Wrecked, 1910
K3	2 × 138 mm guns	2,428 long tons (2,467 t)	2 × screw propellers 2 × triple-expansion steam engines 20 to 20.5 knots	—	—	—

== Jurien de la Gravière ==
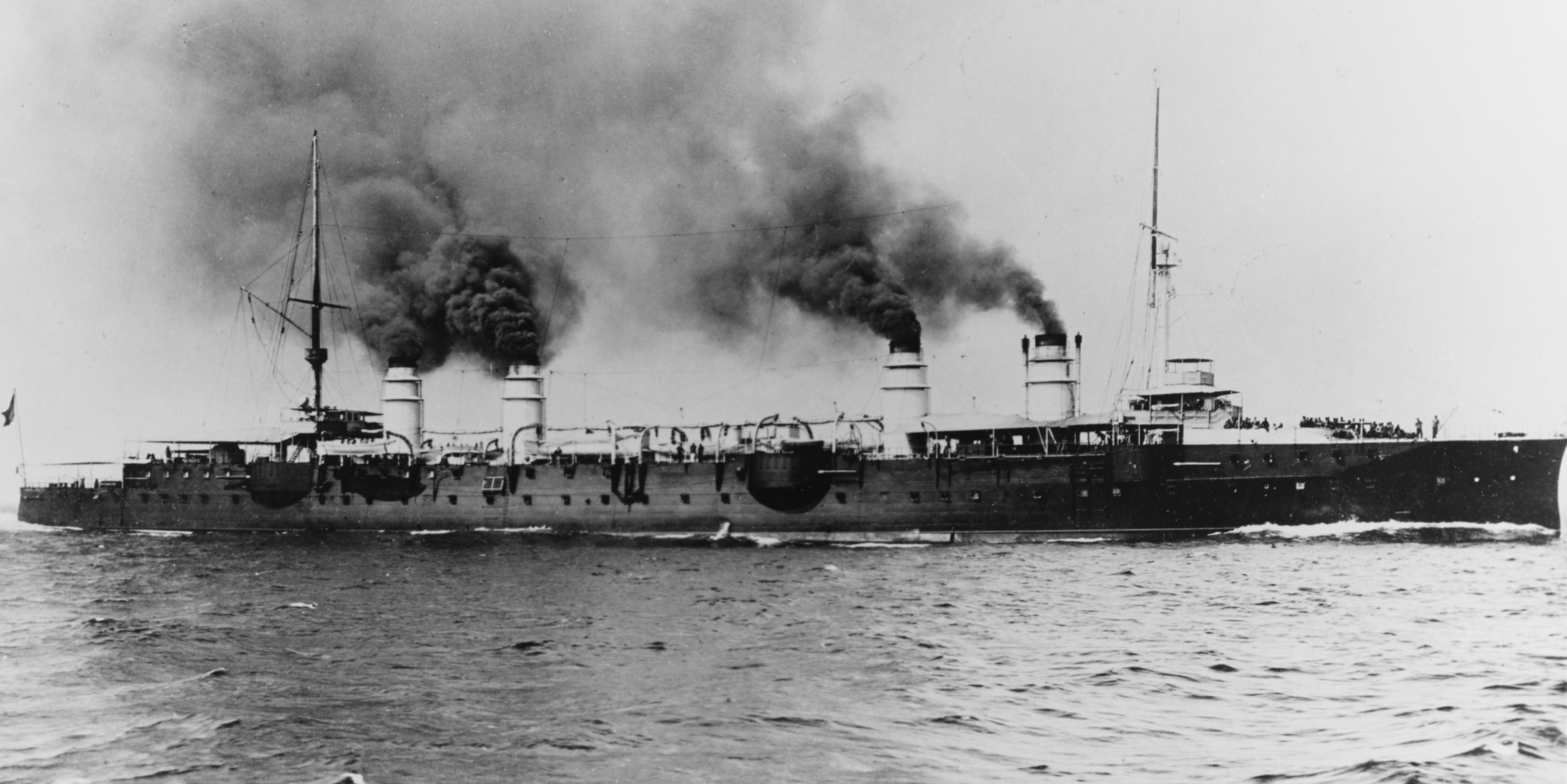
Jurien de la Gravière underway early in her career

Jurien de la Gravière was the final French protected cruiser; her design originated in the disputes over the large protected cruisers built in the mid-1890s. By that time, Admiral Armand Besnard had become the naval minister, and he requested a sister ship to D'Entrecasteaux, which was rejected by the Chamber of Deputies in 1896. The following year, the legislature approved Besnard's request to build a scaled down vessel, which became Jurien de la Gravière.

Completed in 1903, Jurien de la Gravière initially served in the Atlantic Naval Division. Jurien de la Gravière had been transferred to the Reserve Division of the Mediterranean Squadron by 1911, though she was reactivated in 1913 to serve with the main French fleet. She remained on active service into the start of World War I, and after ensuring the safe passage of French Army units, the fleet entered the Adriatic Sea to engage the Austro-Hungarian Navy and fought the Battle of Antivari. Jurien de la Gravière saw no further action during the conflict. The French fleet withdrew to blockade the southern end of the Adriatic and the Austro-Hungarians refused to send their fleet to engage them. After Italy's entry into the war in 1915, the French turned over control of the blockade and withdrew the bulk of the fleet. In October 1916, Jurien de la Gravière was detached to bombard the southern Anatolian coast of the Ottoman Empire. Later that year the fleet was moved to Greek waters to try to coerce the neutral Greek government to join the Allies, which they eventually did. Coal shortages kept the French from conducting any significant operations in 1918. After the war, Jurien de la Gravière served with the Syrian Division until early 1920, when she was recalled to France. She was subsequently sold to ship breakers.

Summary of the Jurien de la Gravière class
Ship	Armament	Displacement	Propulsion	Service		
Ship	Armament	Displacement	Propulsion	Laid down	Completed	Fate
Jurien de la Gravière	8 × 164 mm guns	5,595 long tons (5,685 t)	3 × screw propellers 3 × triple-expansion steam engines 22.9 knots (42.4 km/h; 26.4 mph)	November 1897	1903	Broken up, 1922
