= Jurien de la Gravière =

Juriens de la Gravière usually refers to a French family of magistrates originating in Riom, Auvergne.

People

- Lt. Gen. Guillaume Jurien de la Gravière (1738–1809)
- Charles-Marie Jurien de la Gravière (1763–1836)
- Admiral Pierre Roch Jurien de La Gravière (1772–1849)
- Anne-Blanche Jurien (1773–1840)
- Louis Charles Jurien de la Gravière (1797–1858)
- Admiral Edmond Jurien de La Gravière (1812–1892)

Namesake ships

- French cruiser Jurien de la Gravière, a French Navy protected cruiser during World War I
- French destroyer Jurien de la Gravière, the former Italian Soldati-class destroyer Mitragliere, transferred to the French Navy as war reparations after World War II

Namesake places

- Jurien Bay, Western Australia, named for Charles-Marie Jurien de la Gravière (1763–1836)
