= French ship Intrépide (1800) =

Ship of the line of the French Navy

History

France
- Name: Intrépide
- Launched: 20 November 1790
- Acquired: April 1801
- Captured: 21 October 1805
- Fate: Scuttled on 23 October 1805

General characteristics
- Armament: 74 guns

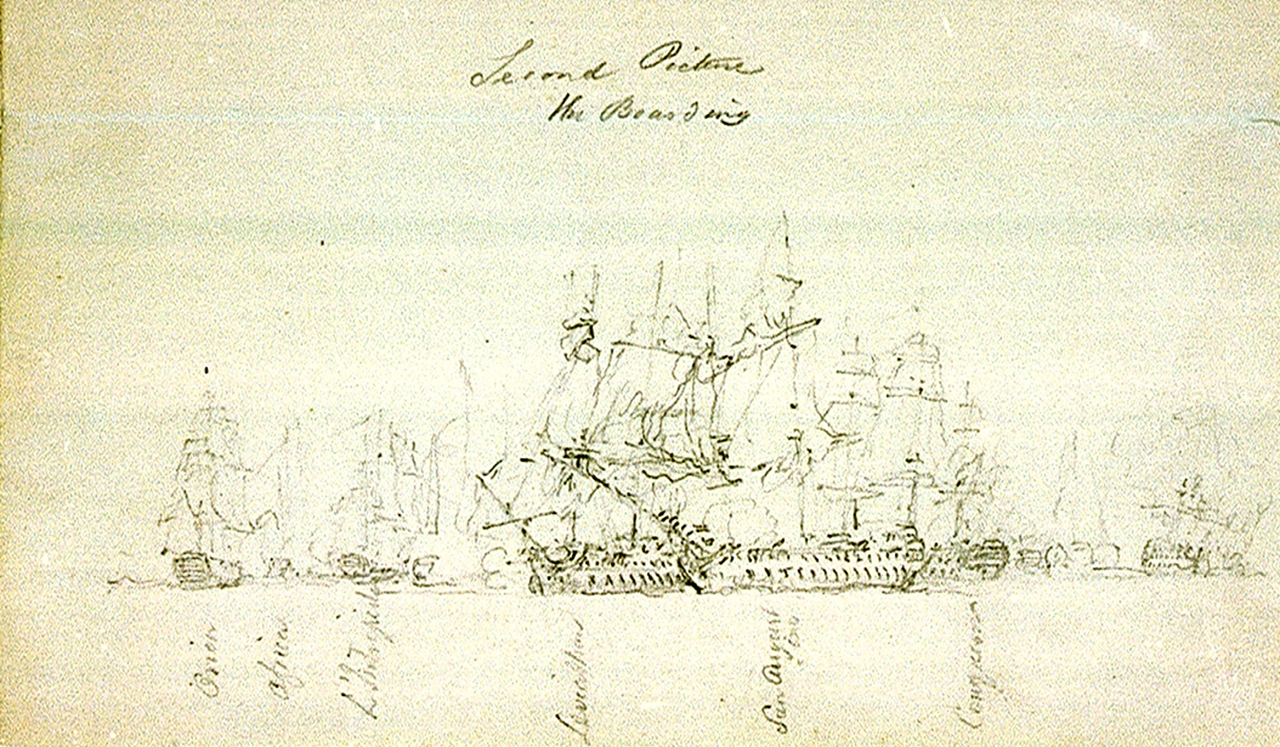
Sketch showing Intrépide at the Battle of Trafalgar, 21 October 1805

Intrépide was a 74-gun third-rate ship of the line of the French navy. She was originally built at Ferrol, Spain in 1790 by José Romero y Fernández de Landa as the Spanish ship of the line Intrepido, one of the ten ships of the San Ildefonso Class, but was transferred to the French Navy in 1801 in accordance with the Third Treaty of San Ildefonso signed in 1800.

On 21 October 1805, Intrépide was one of the ships of Rear-Admiral Pierre Dumanoir le Pelley at the Battle of Trafalgar, under Captain Louis-Antoine Infernet.

Dumanoir commanded the six ship vanguard of the French fleet, with Scipion, Duguay-Trouin, Mont Blanc, Intrépide and Neptuno. Nelson's attacks left these ships downwind of the main confrontation and Dumanoir did not immediately obey Villeneuve's orders to return to the battle. When the ships did turn back, most of them only exchanged a few shots before retiring.

Infernet and his crew, wanting to join the fight, eventually disobeyed Dumanoir's orders and joined the battle, followed by the Spanish 80-gun Neptuno (Captain Cayetano de Valdés). Intrépide fought against Leviathan, Africa, Agamemnon, Ajax, Orion and Conqueror, only to strike her colours at about 17:00, badly damaged with half of her crew dead.

Intrépide was later scuttled on Admiral Collingwood's orders, partly to avoid recapture by the counter-attack of the six ship French squadron led by Captain Julien Cosmao of Pluton, two days later, and partly because the severe gale made it impossible to save most of the damaged prizes.

== See also ==
- List of ships captured in the 19th century
