= Louis-Antoine-Cyprien Infernet =

French Navy officer

Louis-Antoine-Cyprien Infernet (French pronunciation: [lwi ɑ̃twan sipʁijɛ̃ ɛ̃fɛʁnɛ]; 1757–1815) was a French Navy officer, famous for his bravery at the Battle of Trafalgar. He was born of humble origins near Toulon, a relative of André Masséna, he was rough and spoke in a strong Provençal accent. He joined the French Navy as a cabin boy and performed 'powder monkey' duties too. He was a tall man for the time 5 ft 10 in (2 m) and of open, agreeable personality.

Infernet captained Intrépide, a Spanish-built 74-gun ship of the line, at the Battle of Trafalgar. Intrépide was part of Dumanoir's six-ship vanguard squadron; Nelson's plan left these ships downwind and away from the fight, and Dumanoir did not answer Villeneuve's calls to tack and return to engage the British. Eventually, Infernet outraged at Dumanoir's lack of hunger for a fight ordered his ship turned. This was a difficult manoeuvre as the wind had died, but Intrépide was turned after a pulling was lowered, and eventually enough way was gathered to enter the battle. Intrépide engaged HMS Leviathan and Africa, soon rejoined by Agamemnon, Ajax, Orion and Conqueror. Pressed to surrender, Infernet answered in Niçard dialect:

Not in my lifetime, my ship has just been freshly painted!

By then, Intrépide had lost all her masts, half her crew and was filled with 8 ft (2.4 m) of water. Still Infernet did not wish to surrender, but he was held down in tears as his colours were lowered. Along with others he swam for it, carrying his son, a 10-year old midshipman, with him. He was picked up by HMS Orion, where the British, recognizing his bravery treated him, and his crew, with great respect. Intrépide was scuttled the next day to avoid recapture by Cosmao's squadron.

Infernet was taken to England, and later, like most senior captains and admirals was exchanged after a few months.

Along with captain Jean Jacques Étienne Lucas, he was presented to Napoleon at Saint-Cloud. Napoleon stated

If all my ships had behaved like those you commanded, victory would not have been in the balance. I have made you commanders of the Legion of Honour.

After the Bourbon Restoration, Infernet was appointed Knight of the Order of Saint Louis on 18 August 1814. Nevertheless, he was cast aside, and died in Toulon on 15 May 1815.

== Legacy ==
The cruiser Infernet was named in his honour.

== Source and references ==
- Charles Mullié, Biographie des célébrités militaires des armées de terre et de mer de 1789 à 1850, 1852
