= French cruiser Infernet =

French protected cruiser of the 1890s

- Infernet

History

France
- Name: Infernet
- Namesake: Louis-Antoine-Cyprien Infernet
- Builder: Forges et Chantiers de la Gironde
- Laid down: December 1896
- Launched: 7 September 1899
- Completed: 1900
- Fate: Wrecked, 16 November 1910

General characteristics
- Class & type: Destrées-class cruiser
- Displacement: 2,428 long tons (2,467 t)
- Length: 95 m (311 ft 8 in) loa
- Beam: 12 m (39 ft 4 in)
- Draft: 5.39 m (17 ft 8 in)
- Installed power: 8 × water-tube boilers; 8,500 ihp (6,300 kW)
- Propulsion: 2 × triple-expansion steam engines; 2 × screw propellers
- Speed: 20 to 20.5 knots (37.0 to 38.0 km/h; 23.0 to 23.6 mph)
- Range: 8,000 nmi (15,000 km; 9,200 mi) at 10 kn (19 km/h; 12 mph)
- Complement: 235
- Armament: 2 × 138 mm (5.4 in) guns; 4 × 100 mm (3.9 in) guns; 8 × 47 mm (1.9 in) guns; 2 × 37 mm (1.5 in) guns
- Armor: Deck: 38 to 43 mm (1.5 to 1.7 in)

Infernet was the second and final member of the D'Estrées class of protected cruisers built for the French Navy in the 1890s. The D'Estrées-class cruisers were ordered as part of a construction program directed at strengthening the fleet's cruiser force at a time the country was concerned with the growing naval threat of the Italian and German fleets. The new cruisers were intended to serve overseas in the French colonial empire. Infernet was armed with a main battery of two 138 mm (5.4 in) guns, was protected by an armor deck that was 38 to 43 mm (1.5 to 1.7 in) thick, and was capable of steaming at a top speed of up to 20 to 20.5 knots (37.0 to 38.0 km/h; 23.0 to 23.6 mph).

Infernet had a relatively short career. She was completed in 1900, after which she was assigned to the Northern Squadron. In 1901, she was sent to French Madagascar, and two years later, she was transferred to the East Indies, where she remained through 1905. After returning to France, she was sold for demolition in 1910, but was lost by stranding off Les Sables-d'Olonne when in tow to the scrapyard.

== Design ==
Profile and plan drawing of D'Estrées

In the 1880s and 1890s, factions in the French Navy's officer corps argued over the types of cruiser that best served France's interests. Some argued for a fleet of small but fast protected cruisers for commerce raiding, another sought ships useful for patrolling the country's colonial possessions, while another preferred vessels more suited to operations with the home fleet of battleships. The two cruisers of the D'Estrées class were ordered under the construction program of 1896 at the behest of the colonialists for use in the French overseas empire.

Infernet was 95 m (311 ft 8 in) long overall, with a beam of 12 m (39 ft 4 in) and a draft of 5.39 m (17 ft 8 in). She displaced 2,428 long tons (2,467 t). Her crew numbered 235 officers and enlisted men. The ship's propulsion system consisted of a pair of triple-expansion steam engines made by Schneider, driving two screw propellers. Steam was provided by eight coal-burning Normand-type water-tube boilers that were ducted into two widely spaced funnels. Her machinery was rated to produce 8,500 indicated horsepower (6,300 kW) for a top speed of 20 to 20.5 knots (37.0 to 38.0 km/h; 23.0 to 23.6 mph). She had a cruising range of 8,000 nautical miles (15,000 km; 9,200 mi) at a speed of 10 knots (19 km/h; 12 mph).

The ship was armed with a main battery of two 138 mm (5.4 in) Modèle 1893 45-caliber guns. They were placed in individual pivot mounts with gun shields, one forward and aft on the centerline. These were supported by a secondary battery of four 100 mm (3.9 in) guns, which were carried in sponsons. For close-range defense against torpedo boats, she carried eight 47 mm (1.9 in) 3-pounder Hotchkiss guns and two 37 mm (1.5 in) 1-pounder guns. Armor protection consisted of a curved armor deck that was 38 to 43 mm (1.5 to 1.7 in) thick.

== Service history ==
Profile view of one of the D'Estrées-class cruisers

Infernet was built at the Forges et Chantiers de la Gironde shipyard; her keel was laid down in December 1896. The ship was launched on 7 September 1899, having already had her propulsion machinery installed, and she was completed in 1900. She was slated to be deployed to the Pacific, where she was to join the protected cruiser Protet and the transport vessel Aube. But the completion of her sea trials was delayed until later that year; during speed tests, she reached a top speed of 21 knots (39 km/h; 24 mph), exceeding her contract speed by half a knot. The ship was named for Captain Louis-Antoine-Cyprien Infernet, a French naval officer who had seen action at the Battle of Trafalgar in 1805.

By January 1901, Infernet had instead been assigned to the Northern Squadron, which was stationed in Brest, France, though she was not in commission. On 15 March, Infernet was commissioned for a deployment to the East Indies station, where she was to replace the old unprotected cruiser Nielly. The unit was stationed in French Madagascar, then a French colony. There, she joined the cruiser Catinat. The two ships remained on the station in 1902, along with a pair of smaller vessels. Infernet was transferred to the East Indies in the western Pacific and Indian Oceans in 1903. On 4 to 8 March she visited Kuwait, along with the Russian cruiser Boyarin, which was carrying the Russian Consul at Bushire (in modern Iran). The Russian Consul met Ibn Saud, the ruler of Najd, who was in Kuwait at the time, and promised him financial assistance and rifles. This caused concern to the British, who considered any foreign interference in the Persian Gulf area a threat to their colonial interests in the region. On 15 March, Infernet, still accompanied by Boyarin, stopped in Muscat to take on coal, and while there, she was visited by Faisal bin Turki, Sultan of Muscat and Oman. The British cruiser HMS Perseus was present at the time, and Infernet's captain visited the cruiser. She made another stop in the port on 15 May, where she was again visited by bin Turki. She remained in the region through 1905, along with the gunboat Capricorne and a transport aviso.

Infernet returned to home waters sometime thereafter, and was stricken on 9 March 1910, then sold to ship breakers. On 12 November 1910, the German tugboat Hercules took Infernet under tow from La Rochelle to bring her to the breaker's yard in Stettin, Germany, but four days later the tow line broke in heavy seas. Infernet drifted aground off Les Sables-d'Olonne on the Atlantic coast of France and Hercules sheltered in that port. Infernet was found to have come to rest on a shoal, but the water was too low to allow her to be refloated; an initial survey noted that the ship's propellers and rudder were damaged in the grounding. Infernet proved to be a total loss and was broken up in situ.
