= French cruiser D'Estrées =

French protected cruiser of the 1890s

- D'Estrées in Shanghai in around 1920

History

France
- Name: Destrées
- Namesake: Victor-Marie d'Estrées
- Builder: Arsenal de Rochefort
- Laid down: March 1897
- Launched: 27 October 1897
- Completed: 1899
- Stricken: October 1922
- Fate: Broken up, 1924

General characteristics
- Class & type: Destrées-class cruiser
- Displacement: 2,428 long tons (2,467 t)
- Length: 95 m (311 ft 8 in) loa
- Beam: 12 m (39 ft 4 in)
- Draft: 5.39 m (17 ft 8 in)
- Installed power: 8 × water-tube boilers; 8,500 ihp (6,300 kW)
- Propulsion: 2 × triple-expansion steam engines; 2 × screw propellers
- Speed: 20 to 20.5 knots (37.0 to 38.0 km/h; 23.0 to 23.6 mph)
- Range: 8,000 nmi (15,000 km; 9,200 mi) at 10 kn (19 km/h; 12 mph)
- Complement: 235
- Armament: 2 × 138 mm (5.4 in) guns; 4 × 100 mm (3.9 in) guns; 8 × 47 mm (1.9 in) guns; 2 × 37 mm (1.5 in) guns
- Armor: Deck: 38 to 43 mm (1.5 to 1.7 in)

D'Estrées was the lead ship of her class of protected cruisers built for the French Navy in the late 1890s. The class was ordered as part of a construction program directed at strengthening the fleet's cruiser force at a time the country was concerned with the growing naval threat of the Italian and German fleets, and were intended to serve overseas in the French colonial empire. D'Estrées was armed with a main battery of two 138 mm (5.4 in) guns, was protected by an armor deck that was 38 to 43 mm (1.5 to 1.7 in) thick, and was capable of steaming at a top speed of up to 20 to 20.5 knots (37.0 to 38.0 km/h; 23.0 to 23.6 mph).

D'Estrées served in the Northern Squadron after her completion in 1899 before being transferred to the Atlantic Training Division in 1902. She remained in the unit for the next several years. At the start of World War I in August 1914, the ship was initially assigned to the 2nd Light Squadron, but was quickly transferred to reinforce the Syrian Division for operations against the Ottoman Empire. D'Estrées bombarded Ottoman positions along the Syrian coast and helped to enforce a blockade there. She was moved to the Red Sea in 1916, where she patrolled for German commerce raiders for the rest of the war, though she saw no further action. After the war, she was sent to French Indochina, where she spent the remainder of her career. D'Estrées was struck from the naval register in 1922 and broken up.

== Design ==
Profile and plan drawing of D'Estrées

In the 1880s and 1890s, factions in the French Navy's officer corps argued over the types of cruiser that best served France's interests. Some argued for a fleet of small but fast protected cruisers for commerce raiding, another sought ships useful for patrolling the country's colonial possessions, while another preferred vessels more suited to operations with the home fleet of battleships. The two cruisers of the D'Estrées class were ordered under the construction program of 1896 at the behest of the colonialists for use in the French overseas empire.

D'Estrées was 95 m (311 ft 8 in) long overall, with a beam of 12 m (39 ft 4 in) and a draft of 5.39 m (17 ft 8 in). She displaced 2,428 long tons (2,467 t). Her crew numbered 235 officers and enlisted men. The ship's propulsion system consisted of a pair of triple-expansion steam engines driving two screw propellers. Steam was provided by eight coal-burning Normand-type water-tube boilers that were ducted into two widely-spaced funnels. Her machinery was rated to produce 8,500 indicated horsepower (6,300 kW) for a top speed of 20 to 20.5 knots (37.0 to 38.0 km/h; 23.0 to 23.6 mph). She had a cruising range of 8,000 nautical miles (15,000 km; 9,200 mi) at a speed of 10 knots (19 km/h; 12 mph).

The ship was armed with a main battery of two 138 mm (5.4 in) Modèle 1893 45-caliber guns. They were placed in individual pivot mounts with gun shields, one forward and one aft on the centerline. These were supported by a secondary battery of four 100 mm (3.9 in) guns, which were carried in sponsons. For close-range defense against torpedo boats, she carried eight 47 mm (1.9 in) 3-pounder Hotchkiss guns and two 37 mm (1.5 in) 1-pounder guns. Armor protection consisted of a curved armor deck that was 38 to 43 mm (1.5 to 1.7 in) thick.

== Service history ==
Profile view of one of the D'Estrées-class cruisers before 1905

Destrées was built at the Arsenal de Rochefort in Rochefort, France; her keel was laid down in March 1897 and she was launched on 27 October 1897. The ship was completed in 1899, less her armament, and thereafter underwent sea trials and received her armament at the Arsenal. After her trials she was sent to Brest in February 1900, where she joined the Northern Squadron, which at that time, consisted of two pre-dreadnought battleships, four older ironclads, two armored cruisers, and the protected cruiser Guichen, among other smaller vessels. She took part in the squadron maneuvers in June and July that year, which were held off Cherbourg.

She was assigned to the Atlantic Training Division in 1902, along with the armored cruiser Jeanne d'Arc and the protected cruiser Châteaurenault. During that period, she operated on the Newfoundland station, serving along with the cruisers Tage, Suchet, and Descartes. The next year, she was transferred to the Atlantic Squadron, which had previously been amalgamated with the Northern Squadron. At that time, the unit consisted of three protected cruisers: D'Estrées, Tage, and Troude. Later that year, D'Estrées was relieved by the new protected cruiser Jurien de la Gravière, while Tage was replaced by the armored cruiser Dupleix. In 1908, the Naval Division of the Atlantic was amalgamated with the Northern Squadron, and D'Estrées was transferred to that command. By that time, the squadron consisted of eight armored cruisers and four other protected cruisers. That year, D'Estrées was sent to patrol the West Indies.

=== World War I ===
At the start of World War I in August 1914, D'Estrées was stationed in the English Channel as part of the 2nd Light Squadron, which at that time consisted of the armored cruisers Marseillaise, Amiral Aube, Jeanne d'Arc, Gloire, Gueydon, and Dupetit-Thouars. The unit was based in Brest and along with D'Estrées, the squadron was strengthened by the addition of several other cruisers over the following days, including the armored cruisers Kléber and Desaix, the protected cruisers Châteaurenault, Lavoisier, Friant, and Guichen, and several auxiliary cruisers. The ships then conducted a series of patrols in the English Channel in conjunction with a force of four British cruisers. On 25 August, many of the cruisers were detached for other purposes, and D'Estrées was reassigned to the Division de Syrie (Syrian Division) in the eastern Mediterranean.

On 31 January 1915, French naval forces in the region were reorganized as the 3^{e} Escadre (3rd Squadron). In late April, fears that the Ottoman Empire was planning an attack on the Suez Canal prompted the French to send D'Estrées, the protected cruiser D'Entrecasteaux, and Jeanne d'Arc to Port Said to reinforce the warships supporting the land defenses of the canal. No attack materialized, and the ships were sent to bombard Ottoman positions along the coast to force them to disperse their units rather than make attacks on the Suez Canal. D'Estrées and Jeanne d'Arc shelled fuel depots at Alexandretta and Mersina and a factory in Jaffa in May. D'Estrées attacked the German consulate in Alexandretta on 13 May after the local Ottoman official refused to lower the German flag at the building. She destroyed a fuel depot the next day. They also bombarded the German consulates in the first two cities, along with the one in Haifa. D'Estrées, in pursuit of an Ottoman merchant vessel, stopped in Baniyas on 18 May after the steamer fled into the port. D'Estrées sent a boat into the harbor to search for the vessel, and after the French came under fire from Ottomans ashore, D'Estrées bombarded the town, destroying part of it.

Vice Admiral Louis Dartige du Fournet, the commander of the unit, declared a blockade of the coast on 25 June. D'Estrées was assigned to patrol duty in company with the armored cruiser Amiral Charner and the pre-dreadnought Jauréguiberry. D'Estrées assisted in the evacuation of some 4,000 Armenians, who were fleeing the Armenian genocide, from Antakya on 12 and 13 September. Amiral Charner, Guichen, Desaix, and the seaplane tenders Foudre and HMS Anne also contributed to the evacuation effort. As additional forces arrived in the region, the French reorganized the squadron into two divisions, D'Estrées being assigned to the 3rd Squadron on 8 November.

On 20 September 1916, the ship was transferred to the Red Sea, based at Jeddah. She remained there on patrol duty for the rest of the conflict; during this period, she also escorted convoys from French Madagascar to French Somaliland through May 1917. She also patrolled off the island of Socotra. In November, she joined the hunt for the German commerce raider SMS Wolf, which was known to be operating in the Indian Ocean. She was sent to the Maldives, where she learned that civilians there had seen Wolf and the captured Japanese steamer SS Hitachi Maru, but by that time, the German raider and her prize were gone. In 1918, D'Estrées was replaced by the cruiser Du Chayla.

=== Postwar career ===
After the war, the ship was refitted at La Ciotat and was sent to French Indochina, where she remained for the rest of her active career. She was struck from the naval register in October 1922 and was sold to ship breakers two years later.
