= Canon de 138 mm Modèle 1893 naval gun =

Canon de 138 mm Modèle 1893
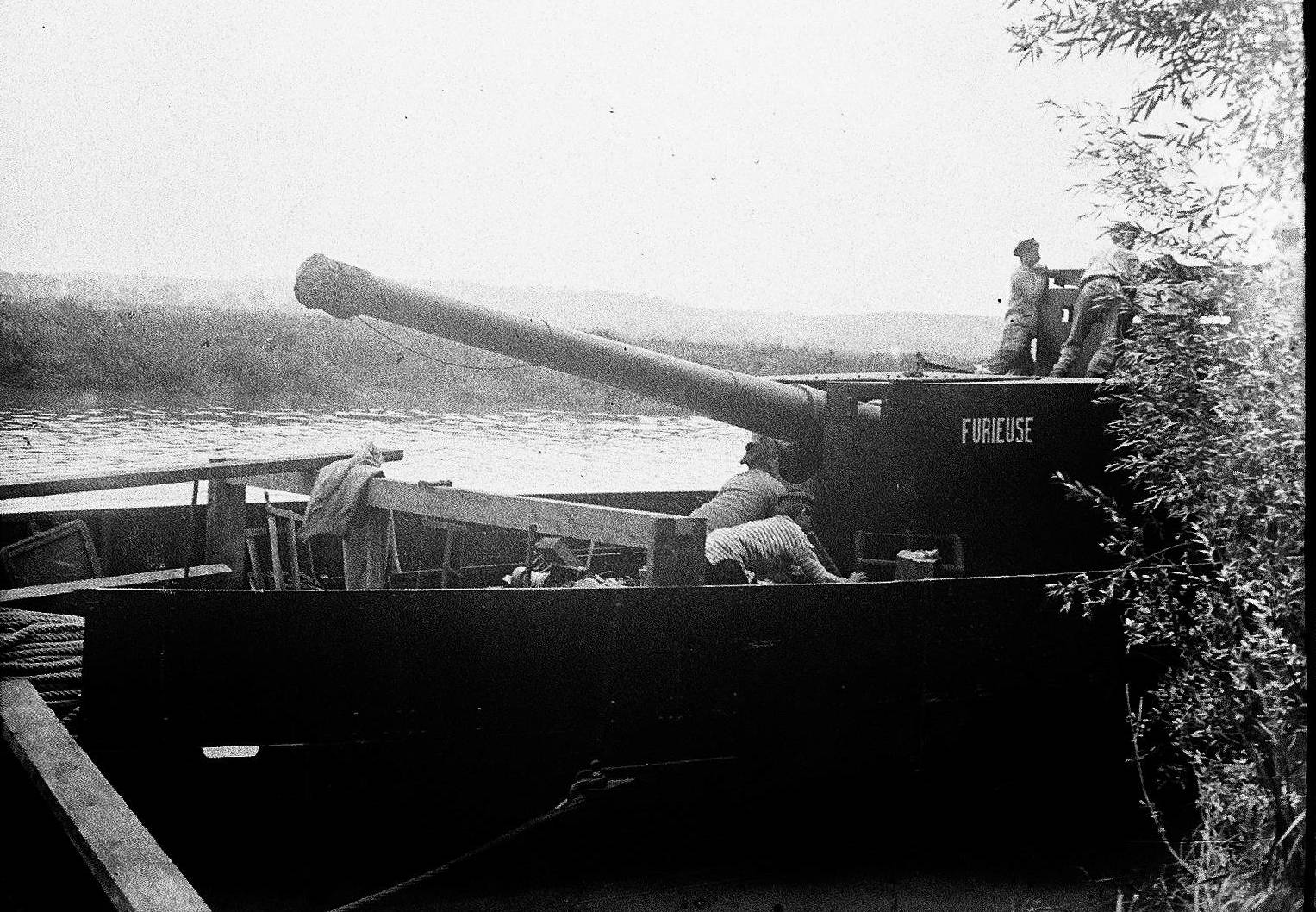
- WWI French gunboats Chaloupe-canonnière fluviale type A were armed with a 138-mm gun Mle 1891
- Type: Naval gun
- Place of origin: France

Service history
- In service: 1887–1945?
- Used by: France
- Wars: World War I, World War II

Production history
- Variants: Modèle 1887; Modèle 1888; Modèle 1891

Specifications
- Mass: 4,080 kg (8,990 lb)
- Barrel length: 6.234 m (20 ft 5.4 in)
- Shell: separate-loading, cased charge
- Shell weight: 30–35 kg (66–77 lb)
- Caliber: 138.6 mm (5.46 in)
- Breech: interrupted screw
- Elevation: Varied by ship, but about -10° to +25°
- Traverse: depending on mount
- Rate of fire: about 4 rpm
- Muzzle velocity: 725–770 m/s (2,380–2,530 ft/s)
- Maximum firing range: 15,000 m (16,000 yd) at 25°

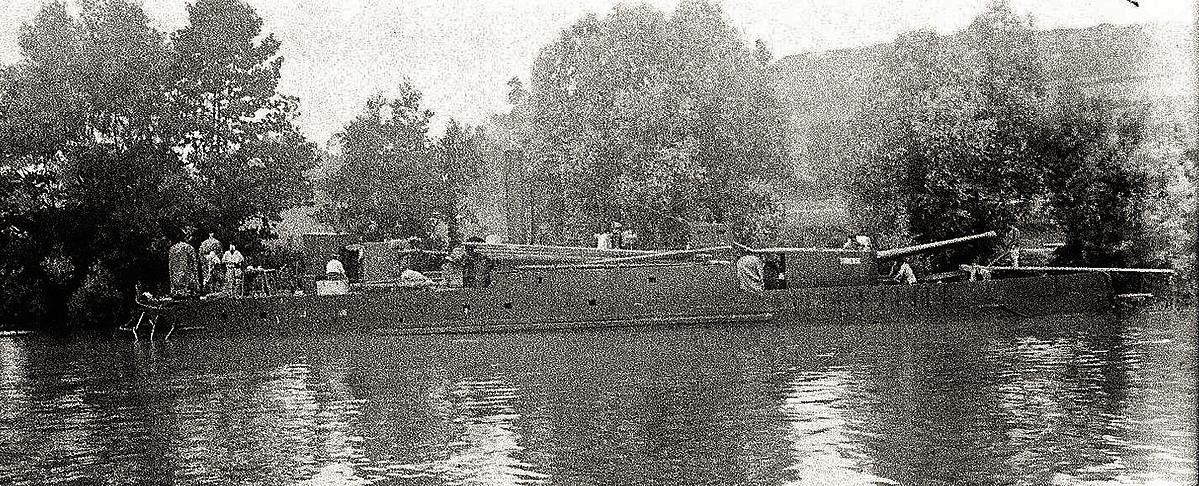
Another view of an Chaloupe-canonnière fluviale type A gunboat.

The Canon de 138 mm Modèle 1893 was a medium-calibre naval gun of the French Navy used during World War I and World War II. It was carried by a number of ships built during the 1890s including the Charlemagne-class pre-dreadnought battleships. Guns from scrapped warships were later mounted on auxiliary ships during the 1930s.

== Design ==
The 45-calibre Mle 1893 was the culmination of a family of guns first produced in 1884. The design progressed from the 30-caliber Mle 1884 and Mle 1891 guns, to the 44-caliber Mle 1888 and Mle 1891 guns and lastly the 45-caliber Mle 1887, Mle 1891 and Mle 1893 guns. The 44-caliber and 45-caliber guns had nearly identical ballistic performance and used the same ammunition. The Mle 1893 used the typical built-up construction of its time. It had a screw breech and used separate-loading ammunition. In the battleships it was installed in armored casemates, using central pivot mounts, but no details are available.

== Railway artillery ==
A number of mle 1884 guns were modified to become railway artillery under the designation Canon de 140 sur affut-truc mle 1884 during 1914. The conversion entailed mounting the gun carriage on a simple flatbed rail wagon built from steel I beams and timbers with five variable gauge axles that allowed the guns to transition from standard gauge 144 cm (56.5 in) to narrow gauge 61 cm (24 in) allowing the guns to be brought closer to the front.

The recoil system for the mle 1884 consisted of a U-shaped gun cradle which held the trunnioned barrel and a slightly inclined firing platform with a hydro-gravity recoil system. When the gun fired the hydraulic buffers slowed the recoil of the cradle which slid up a set of inclined rails on the firing platform and then returned the gun to battery by the combined action of the buffers and gravity. Elevation was largely the same but there was no traverse so in order to aim the gun had to be drawn across a section of curved track or placed on a turntable.

In order to anchor the gun, there was an attachment at the front of the carriage for a tie bar which attached to an earth anchor and there was an ammunition hoist at the rear of the carriage. There were also four wooden beams with one between each axle which were lowered lay across the tracks by screw jacks to take weight off of the axles.

== Ammunition ==
The 7.257-kilogram (16.00 lb) propellant charge for the Mle 1893 was contained in a cartridge case.

Shell type	Weight	Muzzle velocity	Range
Armor-piercing, capped	35 kg (77 lb)	730 m/s (2,400 ft/s)	15,000 m (16,000 yd)
Common shell	30 kg (66 lb)	770 m/s (2,500 ft/s)	N/A
Semi-armor-piercing, capped	35 kg (77 lb)	730 m/s (2,400 ft/s)	N/A
