= French cruiser Cosmao =

Protected cruiser of the French Navy

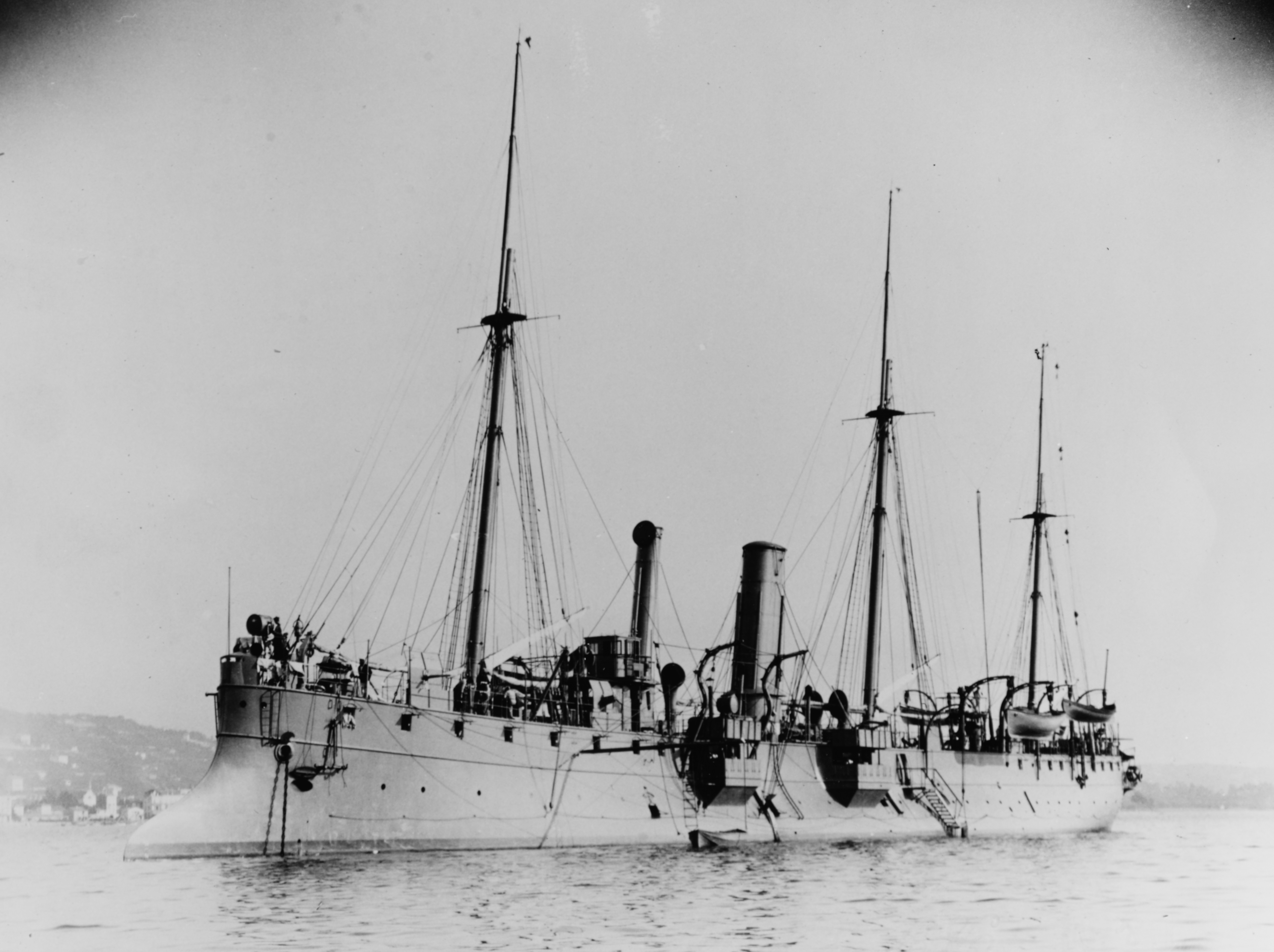
- Cosmao's sister ship Lalande early in her career, c. 1890–1892

History

France
- Name: Cosmao
- Ordered: 25 April 1887
- Builder: Forges et Chantiers de la Gironde
- Laid down: 1887
- Launched: 29 August 1889
- Commissioned: 13 September 1889
- In service: 8 August 1891
- Out of service: 25 April 1919
- Stricken: 30 October 1919
- Fate: Broken up, 1928

General characteristics
- Class & type: Troude-class cruiser
- Displacement: 1,877 t (1,847 long tons; 2,069 short tons)
- Length: 95 m (311 ft 8 in) (lwl)
- Beam: 9.5 m (31 ft 2 in)
- Draft: 4.27 m (14 ft)
- Installed power: 5 × fire-tube boilers; 6,300 ihp (4,700 kW)
- Propulsion: 2 × compound steam engines; 2 × screw propellers
- Speed: 20.5 knots (38.0 km/h; 23.6 mph)
- Range: 2,110 nmi (3,910 km; 2,430 mi) at 10 knots (19 km/h; 12 mph)
- Complement: 200
- Armament: 4 × 138.6 mm (5.46 in) guns; 4 × 47 mm (1.9 in) guns; 4 × 37 mm (1.5 in) Hotchkiss revolver cannon; 4 × 356 mm (14 in) torpedo tubes; 150 naval mines
- Armor: Deck: 40 mm (1.6 in); Conning tower: 40 mm

Cosmao was the third and final member of the Troude class of protected cruisers built for the French Navy in the late 1880s and early 1890s. The class was built as part of a construction program intended to provide scouts for the main battle fleet. They were based on the preceding Forbin class, the primary improvement being the addition of armor to the conning tower. Cosmao was built in the 1880s and was completed in 1890. She was armed with a main battery of four 138 mm (5.4 in) guns, protected with an armor deck that was 41 mm (1.6 in) thick, and had a top speed of 20.5 knots (38.0 km/h; 23.6 mph).

Cosmao served in the Mediterranean Squadron through most of the 1890s, where she was primarily occupied with training exercises with the rest of the unit. She was relieved of that assignment in 1898 and had been placed in reserve by 1901. She saw no further activity until the outbreak of World War I in August 1914, when she was assigned to a patrol group in French Morocco. Tasked with patrolling for German U-boats and protecting Allied merchant shipping, Cosmao saw no combat during the conflict. After the war, she was struck from the naval register in 1922 and thereafter sold to ship breakers.

== Design ==
Plan and profile drawing of the Troude class

Beginning in 1879, the French Navy's Conseil des Travaux (Council of Works) had requested designs for small but fast cruisers of about 2,000 t (1,968 long tons; 2,205 short tons) displacement that could be used as scouts for the main battle fleet. The unprotected cruiser Milan was the first of the type, which was developed into the Forbin-type of protected cruisers after the Conseil requested light armor protection for the ships. After the first two ships were ordered, the navy requested competing proposals from private shipyards, and the design from Forges et Chantiers de la Gironde was selected, which became the Troude class. In total, six ships were ultimately ordered, three per class; all were very similar. All of the ships were ordered by Admiral Théophile Aube, then the French Minister of Marine and an ardent supporter of the Jeune École doctrine; proponents of the concept favored the use of cruisers to attack an opponent's merchant shipping instead of a fleet of expensive battleships.

Cosmao was 95 m (311 ft 8 in) long at the waterline, with a beam of 9.5 m (31 ft 2 in) and an average draft of 4.27 m (14 ft). She displaced 1,877 t (1,847 long tons; 2,069 short tons) as designed. Her crew amounted to 200 officers and enlisted men. The ship's propulsion system consisted of a pair of compound steam engines driving two screw propellers. Steam was provided by five coal-burning fire-tube boilers that were ducted into two funnels. Her machinery was rated to produce 6,300 indicated horsepower (4,700 kW) for a top speed of 20.5 knots (38.0 km/h; 23.6 mph). At a more economical speed of 10 knots (19 km/h; 12 mph), the ship could steam for 2,110 nautical miles (3,910 km; 2,430 mi).

The ship was armed with a main battery of four 138.6 mm (5.46 in) 30-caliber guns in individual pivot mounts, all in sponsons located amidships with two guns per broadside. For close-range defense against torpedo boats, she carried four 47 mm (1.9 in) 3-pounder Hotchkiss guns and four 37 mm (1.5 in) 1-pounder Hotchkiss revolver cannon. She was also armed with four 356 mm (14 in) torpedo tubes in her hull above the waterline, two in the bow and two further aft, one per broadside. She had provisions to carry up to 150 naval mines. Armor protection consisted of a curved armor deck that was 40 mm (1.6 in) thick, along with 40 mm plating on the conning tower. Above the deck, a cofferdam was intended to control flooding from battle damage.

=== Modifications ===
Cosmao underwent a series of alterations during her career, primarily focused on updating her armament. In 1894–1895, the ship had a refit that effected a number of changes, including reinforcing the sponsons for the main battery guns, altering the sailing rig, and converting the main battery to quick-firing guns (QF). The latter consisted of newer M1884 pattern guns, unlike her sisters, which received converted M1881/84 guns. After November 1895, the bow torpedo tubes were removed. Her sailing rig was reduced in 1902. The light armament was standardized to nine 47 mm guns by 1904, and the remaining torpedo tubes were removed. By this time, her displacement had increased to 2,070 t (2,040 long tons; 2,280 short tons) at full load. The ship had her mainmast removed in 1913.

In December 1916, Cosmao—the only member of the class still in service by that time—was disarmed temporarily, before being re-armed in March 1917 with a pair of 100 mm (3.9 in) guns taken from the cruiser Descartes and four 90 mm (3.5 in) M1877 guns. The following year, one of the 100 mm guns and two of the 90 mm guns were removed to be installed on other vessels.

== Service history ==
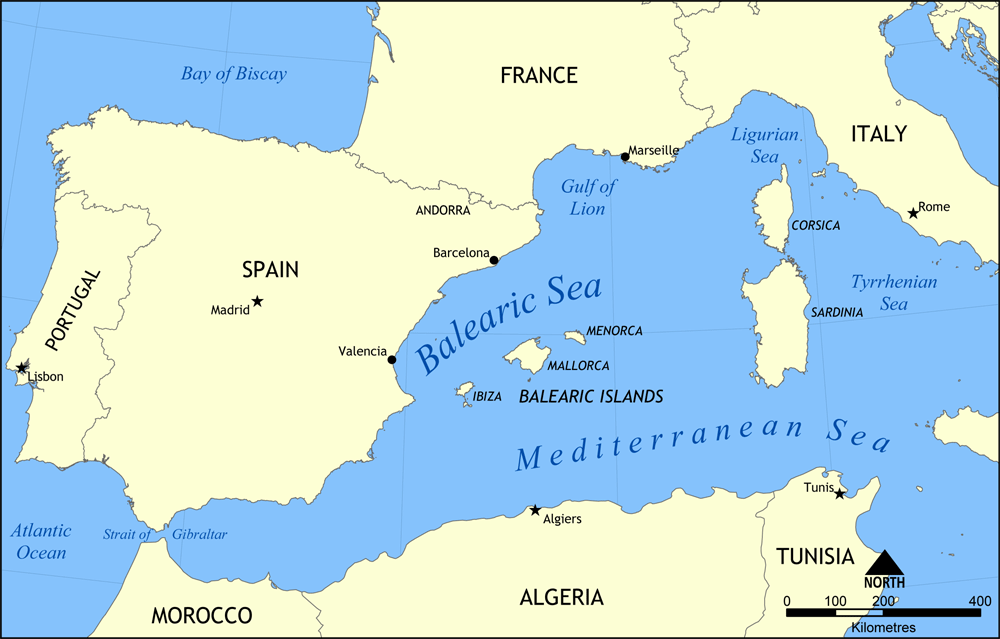
Map of the western Mediterranean, where Cosmao operated for much of her career

The order for Cosmao was placed on 25 April 1887. Work on Cosmao began with her keel laying at the Forges et Chantiers de la Gironde shipyard in Lormont in 1887. She was launched on 29 August 1889 and was commissioned on 13 September; the same day, she moved to Rochefort to complete fitting out. She thereafter conducted sea trials, which lasted until 8 August 1891, when she was placed in full commission. She was then assigned to the Escadre de la Méditerranée (Mediterranean Squadron), the main French battle fleet., departing Rochefort for Toulon on 14 August. By 1893, the unit also included several modern ironclad warships, the armored cruiser Dupuy de Lome, and the protected cruisers Amiral Cécille, Jean Bart, Troude, and Lalande.

In June 1894, Cosmao was sent to Toulon to have her guns replaced with quick-firing versions; this work lasted until February 1895. She returned to service with the unit that year, by which time the fleet's cruiser division consisted of Cosmao, her sister ships Lalande and Troude, Tage, and Suchet. She took part in the annual fleet maneuvers that year, which began on 1 July and took place in three phases. The first consisted of squadron exercises and shooting practice, the second included a cruise between several French ports in the Mediterranean, and the third centered on a simulated battle between elements of the fleet organized into three separate divisions. The maneuvers concluded on 26 July.

She remained part of the Mediterranean Squadron in 1896, and the maneuvers for that year took place from 6 to 30 July. The ship remained assigned to the Mediterranean Squadron in 1897. The annual maneuvers were conducted in July, and during the exercises, Cosmao failed to detect the ships of the Reserve Squadron, which were serving as the simulated enemy fleet. Cosmao continued operating with the unit into 1898, but in April, her place in the unit was taken by the new cruiser Lavoisier. On 3 May, the latter vessel arrived in Toulon and men from Cosmao were taken to complete the new vessel's crew. Cosmao and her sister ships had been deactivated and placed in the reserve fleet by January 1901. Cosmao returned to Rochefort in 1904 to be re-boilered, which was completed by 1905. By 1911, Cosmao had been reactivated and assigned to the Division du Maroc (Morocco Division), based in French Morocco.

=== World War I ===
By the start of World War I in August 1914, the ship lay at Casablanca in French Morocco. She was assigned to the Morocco Division, along with the cruiser Cassard. The two cruisers, soon to be joined by the armored cruisers Amiral Charner, Bruix, and Latouche-Tréville, were tasked with patrolling the sea lanes off the coast of northwestern Africa and protect merchant shipping from commerce raiders. They were also responsible for escorting convoys and patrolling anchorages in the Canary Islands to ensure German U-boats were not using them to refuel. The cruisers operated out of Oran, French Morocco. By late September, it had become clear that German raiders were not operating in the area, so the armored cruisers were transferred elsewhere, though Cosmao remained on station with Cassard, and they were joined by the protected cruiser Friant. The three cruisers patrolled for German arms shipments to Spain and Spanish Morocco.

Between 13 and 20 December 1916, Cosmao had her main battery removed at Gibraltar, before later moving to Bordeaux to be rearmed on 29 March 1917. Her armament was reduced again in 1918, and in October she was sent to patrol the Syrian coast in the Levant Station through the end of the war in November. She remained there until March 1919, when she was sent to Rochefort, where an inspection revealed her boilers to be in very poor condition. She was placed in reserve on 25 April 1919 and was struck from the naval register on 30 October. She was used as a storage hulk in Rochefort from 1920 to 1927, and she was sold the following year to Société Goldenberg to be broken up in Rochefort.
