= French cruiser Troude =

Protected cruiser of the French Navy

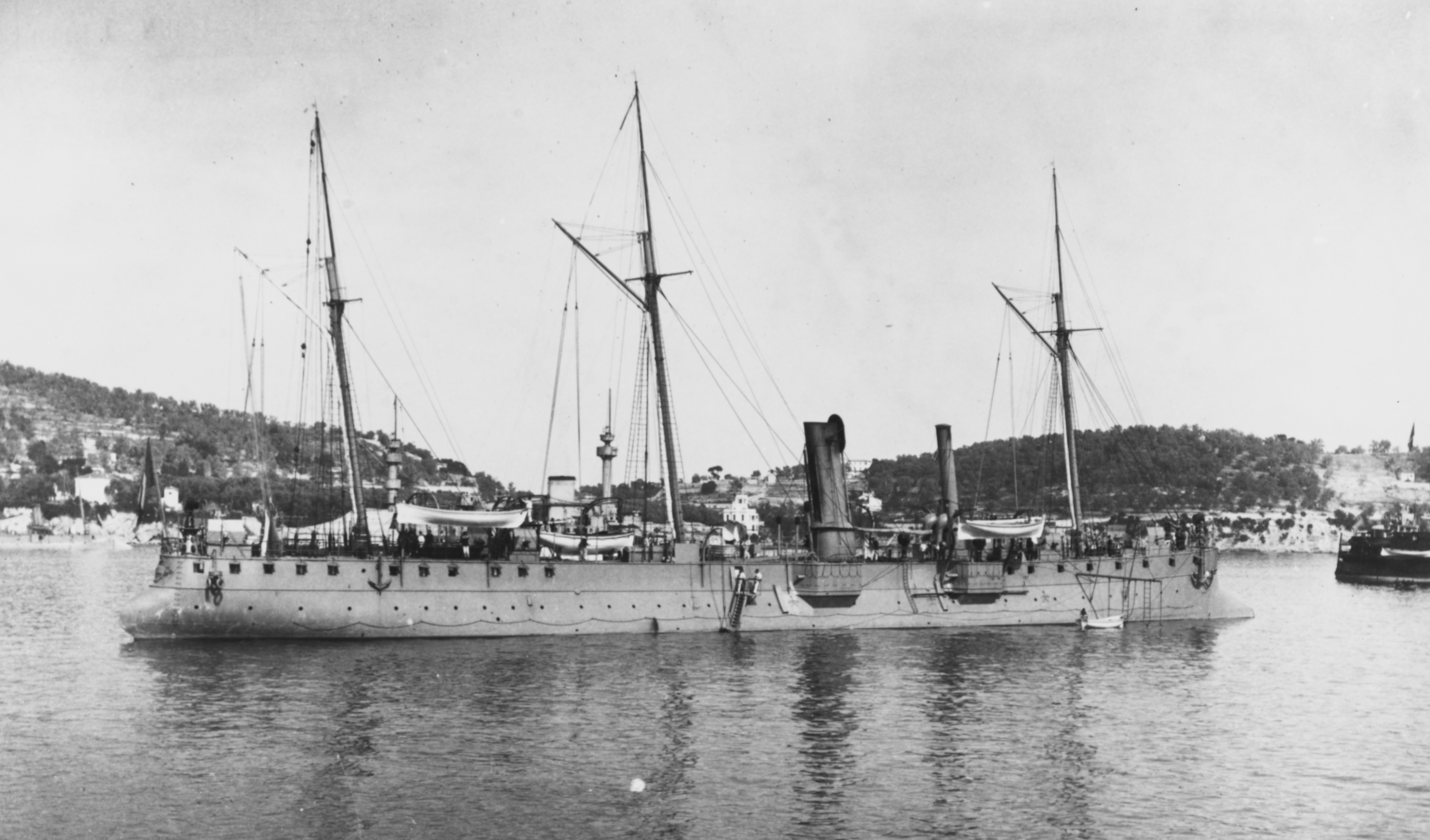
- Troude early in her career

History

France
- Name: Troude
- Ordered: 16 August 1886
- Builder: Forges et Chantiers de la Gironde
- Laid down: 27 August 1886
- Launched: 22 October 1888
- Completed: January 1891
- Commissioned: 6 December 1888
- In service: 5 February 1891
- Out of service: 1 July 1906
- Stricken: 3 July 1907
- Fate: Broken up, c. 1908

General characteristics
- Class & type: Troude-class cruiser
- Displacement: 1,877 t (1,847 long tons; 2,069 short tons)
- Length: 95 m (311 ft 8 in) (lwl)
- Beam: 9.5 m (31 ft 2 in)
- Draft: 4.27 m (14 ft)
- Installed power: 5 × fire-tube boilers; 6,300 ihp (4,700 kW)
- Propulsion: 2 × compound steam engines; 2 × screw propellers
- Speed: 20.5 knots (38.0 km/h; 23.6 mph)
- Range: 2,110 nmi (3,910 km; 2,430 mi) at 10 knots (19 km/h; 12 mph)
- Complement: 200
- Armament: 4 × 138.6 mm (5.46 in) guns; 4 × 47 mm (1.9 in) guns; 4 × 37 mm (1.5 in) Hotchkiss revolver cannon; 4 × 356 mm (14 in) torpedo tubes; 150 naval mines
- Armor: Deck: 40 mm (1.6 in); Conning tower: 40 mm

Troude was a protected cruiser of the French Navy, the lead ship of the Troude class. The class was built as part of a construction program intended to provide scouts for the main battle fleet. They were based on the preceding Forbin class, the primary improvement being the addition of armor to the conning tower. Troude was built in the 1880s and was completed in late 1890. She was armed with a main battery of four 138 mm (5.4 in) guns, protected with an armor deck that was 41 mm (1.6 in) thick, and had a top speed of 20.5 knots (38.0 km/h; 23.6 mph).

Troude spent most of the 1890s in the Mediterranean Squadron, and in 1897, she was transferred to the Levant Division. There, she briefly served as the divisional flagship and later took part in the international intervention in the Cretan Revolt in 1897–1898. By 1901, Troude was in reserve, but she was reactivated in 1903 for a tour with the Atlantic Squadron. She patrolled fisheries off the coast of North America in 1904 before returning to the Atlantic Squadron in 1905. She was struck from the naval register in 1907 or 1908 and thereafter broken up for scrap.

== Design ==
Plan and profile drawing of the Troude class

Beginning in 1879, the French Navy's Conseil des Travaux (Council of Works) had requested designs for small but fast cruisers of about 2,000 t (1,968 long tons; 2,205 short tons) displacement that could be used as scouts for the main battle fleet. The unprotected cruiser Milan was the first of the type, which was developed into the Forbin-type of protected cruisers after the Conseil requested light armor protection for the ships. After the first two ships were ordered, the navy requested competing proposals from private shipyards, and the design from Forges et Chantiers de la Gironde was selected, which became the Troude class. In total, six ships were ultimately ordered, three per class; all were very similar. All of the ships were ordered by Admiral Théophile Aube, then the French Minister of Marine and an ardent supporter of the Jeune École doctrine; proponents of the concept favored the use of cruisers to attack an opponent's merchant shipping instead of a fleet of expensive battleships.

Troude was 95 m (311 ft 8 in) long at the waterline, with a beam of 9.5 m (31 ft 2 in) and an average draft of 4.27 m (14 ft). She displaced 1,877 t (1,847 long tons; 2,069 short tons) as designed. Her crew amounted to 200 officers and enlisted men. The ship's propulsion system consisted of a pair of compound steam engines driving two screw propellers. Steam was provided by five coal-burning fire-tube boilers that were ducted into two funnels. Her machinery was rated to produce 6,300 indicated horsepower (4,700 kW) for a top speed of 20.5 knots (38.0 km/h; 23.6 mph). At a more economical speed of 10 knots (19 km/h; 12 mph), the ship could steam for 2,110 nautical miles (3,910 km; 2,430 mi).

The ship was armed with a main battery of four 138.6 mm (5.46 in) 30-caliber guns in individual pivot mounts, all in sponsons located amidships with two guns per broadside. For close-range defense against torpedo boats, she carried four 47 mm (1.9 in) 3-pounder Hotchkiss guns and four 37 mm (1.5 in) 1-pounder Hotchkiss revolver cannon. She was also armed with four 356 mm (14 in) torpedo tubes in her hull above the waterline, two in the bow and two further aft, one per broadside. She had provisions to carry up to 150 naval mines. Armor protection consisted of a curved armor deck that was 40 mm (1.6 in) thick, along with 40 mm plating on the conning tower. Above the deck, a cofferdam was intended to control flooding from battle damage.

=== Modifications ===
Troude underwent a series of alterations during her career, primarily focused on updating her armament. In 1893–1894, Troude had her cofferdam replaced by a layer of highly sub-divided watertight compartments that covered the entire width of the deck. A number of other changes were also carried out, including reinforcing the sponsons for the main battery guns, altering the sailing rig, and converting the main battery to quick-firing guns (QF). The latter consisted of converted M1881/84 pattern guns. After November 1895, the bow torpedo tubes were removed. Her sailing rig was reduced in 1902. The light armament was standardized to nine 47 mm guns by 1904, and the remaining torpedo tubes were removed. By this time, her displacement had increased to 2,025 t (1,993 long tons; 2,232 short tons) at full load.

== Service history ==
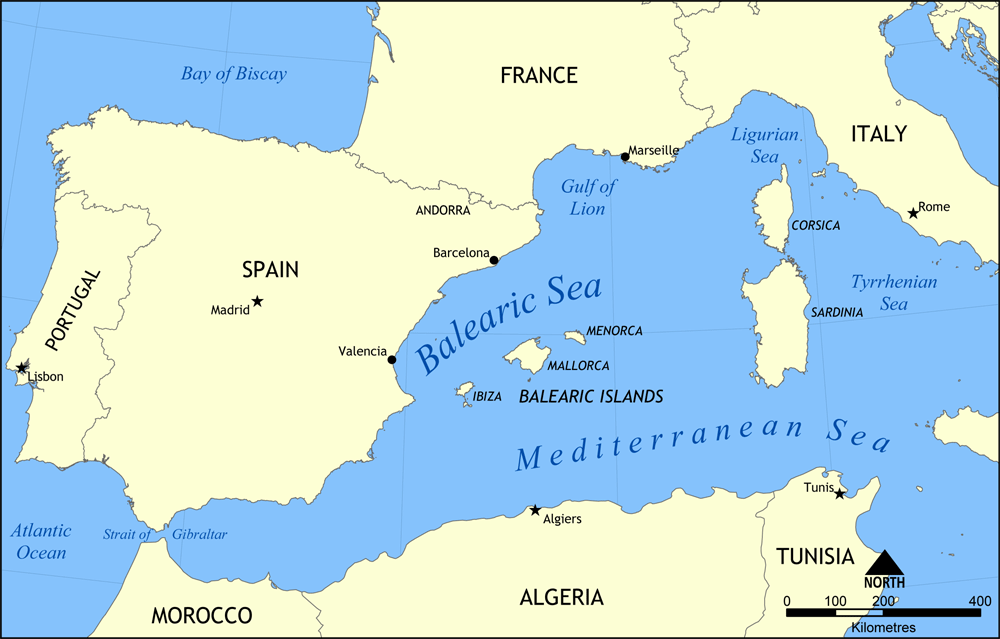
Map of the western Mediterranean, where Troude operated for much of her career

The contract for Troude was placed on 16 August 1886 with the Forges et Chantiers de la Gironde shipyard in Lormont. She was laid down eleven days later, the first member of her class to begin construction. She was launched on 22 October 1888, was moved to Rochefort on 24–25 November for fitting-out, and was commissioned for sea trials on 6 December 1888. The ship's propulsion system proved to be troublesome during her trials, which lasted for more than two years. She completed trials on 18 December 1890, and was accepted by the French Navy in January 1891, though she was not placed in full commission for active service until 5 January. On entering service, she was assigned to the Mediterranean Squadron, the main French battle fleet, and she departed Rochefort on 15 February.

By 1893, the unit also included several modern ironclad warships, the armored cruiser Dupuy de Lome, and four other protected cruisers, Amiral Cécille, Jean Bart, and her sister ships Cosmao and Lalande. Troude was refitted extensively between October 1893 and May 1894. By 1895, she had returned to the unit, by which time the fleet's cruiser division consisted of Troude, Lalande, Cosmao, and the protected cruisers Tage, and Suchet. She took part in the fleet maneuvers that year, which began on 1 July and concluded on the 27th. She was assigned to "Fleet B", which along with "Fleet A" represented the French fleet, and was tasked with defeating the hostile "Fleet C", which represented the Italian fleet.

She remained in the Mediterranean Squadron in 1896, and she took part in that year's maneuvers as part of the cruiser screen for the 3rd Division. The maneuvers for that year took place from 6 to 30 July. Troude initially remained with the active units of the Mediterranean Squadron in 1897. Later that year, she served as the flagship of Rear Admiral Édouard Pottier in the Levant Division at the start of the Cretan Revolt of 1897–1898. By 1898, the armored cruiser Amiral Charner had replaced Troude as the flagship, allowing the latter to return to France. Troude served in the North Atlantic Division in 1900, along with Amiral Cécille and Suchet. That year, she was placed out of service at Rochefort to be re-boilered; the work lasted until 1902.

In 1903, the ship was reactivated and assigned to the Atlantic Squadron, which had previously been amalgamated with the Northern Squadron. At that time, the unit consisted of Tage, Troude, and the protected cruiser D'Estrées. She operated as part of the Newfoundland and Iceland Naval Division in 1904 in company with the protected cruiser Lavoisier, which was tasked with patrolling fishing areas off the coast of North America. In 1905, she operated in the Atlantic Squadron with the armored cruiser Dupleix and the protected cruiser Jurien de la Gravière. On 1 July 1906, Troude was placed in the category of special reserve, and was struck from the naval register on 3 July 1907. She was placed for sale at Rochefort in 1907 or 1908 and thereafter broken up for scrap.
