= French cruiser Surcouf =

Protected cruiser of the French Navy

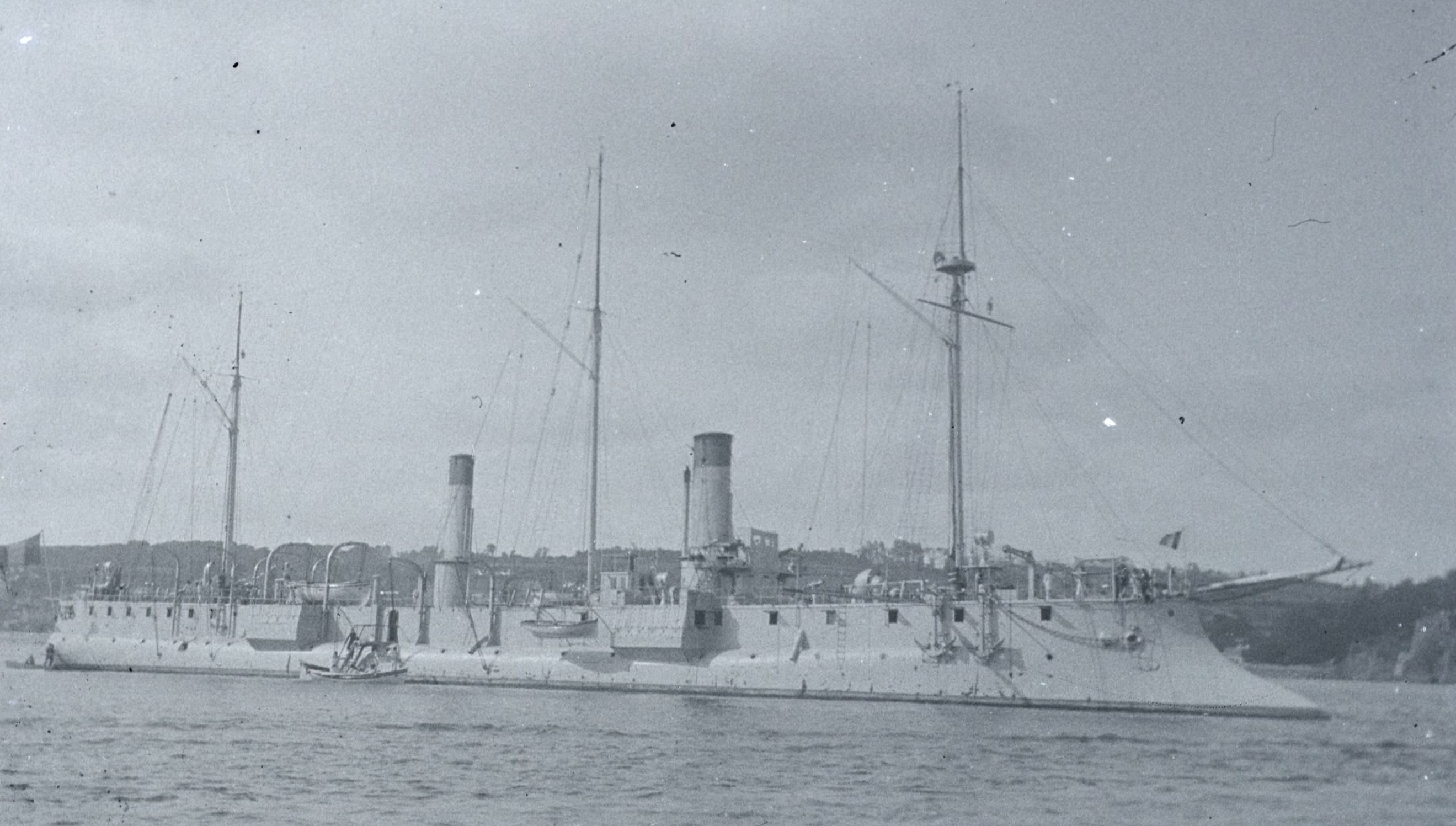
- Surcouf in the roadstead of Brest, 1902.

History

France
- Name: Surcouf
- Ordered: 7 April 1886
- Builder: Arsenal de Cherbourg
- Laid down: May 1886
- Launched: 9 October 1888
- Commissioned: 27 November 1889
- Stricken: 4 April 1921
- Fate: Broken up, 1921

General characteristics
- Class & type: Forbin-class cruiser
- Displacement: 1,857 t (1,828 long tons; 2,047 short tons)
- Length: 96.1 m (315 ft 3 in) loa
- Beam: 9.33 m (30 ft 7 in)
- Draft: 4.5 m (14 ft 9 in)
- Installed power: 6 × fire-tube boilers; 6,200 ihp (4,600 kW)
- Propulsion: 2 × compound steam engines; 2 × screw propellers
- Sail plan: Schooner rig
- Speed: 20 knots (37 km/h; 23 mph)
- Range: 2,400 nmi (4,400 km; 2,800 mi) at 10 knots (19 km/h; 12 mph)
- Complement: 209
- Armament: 4 × 138.6 mm (5.46 in) guns; 3 × 47 mm (1.9 in) guns; 4 × 37 mm (1.5 in) Hotchkiss revolver cannon; 4 × 356 mm (14 in) torpedo tubes
- Armor: Deck: 40 mm (1.6 in)

Surcouf was the second Forbin-class protected cruiser built for the French Navy in the late 1880s and early 1890s. The Forbin-class cruisers were built as part of a construction program intended to provide scouts for the main battle fleet. They were based on the earlier unprotected cruiser Milan, with the addition of an armor deck to improve their usefulness in battle. They had a high top speed for the time, at around 20 knots (37 km/h; 23 mph), and they carried a main battery of four 138 mm (5.4 in) guns.

The ship saw little activity in the 1890s, being assigned to the Northern Squadron from 1893 to 1895, temporarily reactivated to participate in training exercises with the unit in 1897, and then assigned to the squadron again from 1898 to 1899. During her periods of active service, she was primarily occupied with training maneuvers. Surcouf returned to the Northern Squadron in 1901 and served there through 1908, apart from a brief stint in East Asia in 1902. She saw little activity thereafter, until she was sent to the Gulf of Guinea late in World War I. The ship was ultimately removed from the naval register in 1921 and broken up.

== Design ==
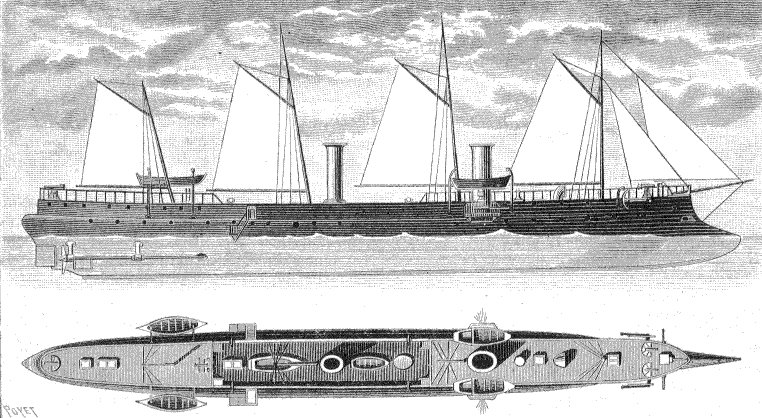
Profile drawing of an early version of the Forbin design, depicting the original four-masted rig used aboard Forbin

Beginning in 1879, the French Navy's Conseil des Travaux (Council of Works) had requested designs for small but fast cruisers of about 2,000 long tons (2,032 t) displacement that could be used as scouts for the main battle fleet. The unprotected cruiser Milan was the first of the type, which was developed into the Forbin-type of protected cruisers after the Conseil requested light armor protection for the ships. The three Forbins, along with the three very similar Troude-class cruisers, were ordered by Admiral Théophile Aube, then the French Minister of Marine and an ardent supporter of the Jeune École doctrine. Aube intended to use the new cruisers as commerce raiders, rather than fleet scouts.

Surcouf was 95 m (311 ft 8 in) long at the waterline and 96.1 m (315 ft 3 in) long overall, with a beam of 9.33 m (30 ft 7 in) and an average draft of 4.5 m (14 ft 9 in). She displaced 1,857 t (1,828 long tons; 2,047 short tons). Her crew amounted to 209 officers and enlisted men. The ship's propulsion system consisted of a pair of compound steam engines driving two screw propellers. Steam was provided by six coal-burning fire-tube boilers that were ducted into two funnels. Her machinery was rated to produce 6,200 indicated horsepower (4,600 kW) for a top speed of 20 knots (37 km/h; 23 mph). She had a cruising radius of 2,395 nautical miles (4,436 km; 2,756 mi) at a speed of 10 knots (19 km/h; 12 mph).

The ship was armed with a main battery of four 138.6 mm (5.46 in) 30-caliber guns in individual pivot mounts, all in sponsons with two guns per broadside. For close-range defense against torpedo boats, she carried three 47 mm (1.9 in) 3-pounder Hotchkiss guns and four 37 mm (1.5 in) 1-pounder Hotchkiss revolver cannon. She was also armed with four 356 mm (14 in) torpedo tubes in her hull above the waterline, two forward and two further aft. She had provisions to carry up to 150 naval mines. Armor protection consisted of an armor deck that was 40 mm (1.6 in) thick and sloped downward at the sides to provide a measure of vertical protection. Above the deck, a highly subdivided layer of watertight compartments was intended to control flooding. A thin anti-splinter deck below the armor deck covered the machinery spaces.

=== Modifications ===
Surcouf underwent a series of refits and modernizations throughout her career. The first of these took place in 1893, and centered on updates to the armament. The main battery was converted to M1881/84 quick-firing guns, and the light armament now consisted of five 47 mm guns, three 37 mm guns, and four 37 mm revolver cannon. In 1896, the two forward torpedo tubes were removed, along with the shields for the light guns. A more extensive reconstruction took place in 1905–1906. The refit included removing all of the 37 mm guns in favor of a uniform light armament of seven 47 mm guns. Two 37 mm guns were kept aboard to be mounted to the ship's boats. By that time, the remaining torpedo tubes had also been removed. By this time, the ship's sailing rig was removed; Surcouf had retained her rig long after the other members of the class had theirs cut down in 1892, though exact time is unknown. The historian Stephen Roberts states that it was "probably...around 1906." At some point, the ship's boilers were modified to incorporate mixed coal and oil firing.

During World War I in 1916, Surcouf had a pair of 47 mm anti-aircraft guns installed on her foredeck. Around the same time, one of her 47 mm guns and the two 37 mm guns were put ashore in the formerly German colony of Kamerun. In 1917, the ship was disarmed altogether and converted into a depot ship for submarines.

== Service history ==
=== Construction – 1896 ===
Surcouf was ordered on 7 April 1886 and was laid down at the Arsenal de Cherbourg on 4 October 1886 in Cherbourg. She was launched on 9 October 1888. She was commissioned for sea trials on 27 November 1899. (Note: According to Roberts, the ship was launched on 9 October 1889 and commissioned for trials on 27 November of the same year, a remarkably short period to complete fitting out. Conway's All the World's Fighting Ships states the launching took place in October 1888, which corresponds with contemporary reports such as Brassey's The Naval Annual. The date given in Roberts is clearly a typographical error.) The ship was placed in full commission on 10 October 1890, and on the 23rd, she was assigned to the Northern Squadron, based in the English Channel. She remained with the unit through 1893, by which time it included the ironclads Requin and Victorieuse, the coastal defense ship Furieux, and the cruiser Alger. The following year, Surcouf continued to operate with the squadron. She took part in annual training exercises that year to evaluate the effectiveness of the French coastal defense system. The squadron went to sea on 15 July and began the operations the next day, which lasted until 29 July. The maneuvers demonstrated the usefulness of torpedo boat flotillas in coastal defense, but highlighted that France's coastal defense system in the Channel was not yet complete.

She remained in the unit through 1895. The squadron was kept in commission for only four months per year. The unit at that time consisted of Furieux, the ironclads Requin, Victorieuse, and Suffren, the armored cruiser Latouche-Tréville, and the protected cruisers Jean Bart and Coëtlogon. Surcouf took part in the annual fleet maneuvers that began on 1 July; as she was in partial commission, she had to take on naval reservists in Cherbourg to bring her crew to the full number. The exercises took place in two phases, the first being a simulated amphibious assault in Quiberon Bay, and the second revolving around a blockade of Rochefort and Cherbourg. The maneuvers concluded on the afternoon of 23 July.

By 1896, she was reduced to the 2nd category of reserve, along with several old coastal defense ships, ironclads, and other cruisers. They were retained in a state that allowed them to be mobilized in the event of a major war. Surcouf was mobilized in 1897 to participate in the large-scale maneuvers of that year with the Northern Squadron, which were held in July. Surcouf and the bulk of the squadron were tasked with intercepting the coastal defense ship Bouvines, which was to steam from Cherbourg to Brest between 15 and 16 July. As with the previous year's maneuvers, the defending squadron was unable to intercept Bouvines before she reached Brest. The squadron then moved to Quiberon Bay for another round of maneuvers from 18 to 21 July. This scenario saw the protected cruisers Sfax and Tage simulate a hostile fleet steaming from the Mediterranean Sea to attack France's Atlantic coast. Unlike the previous exercises, Surcouf and the rest of the Northern Squadron successfully intercepted the cruisers and "defeated" them.

=== 1898–1921 ===
Surcouf was reactivated in 1898 and was assigned to the Northern Squadron, by which time the unit consisted of the ironclad Hoche, four modern coastal defense ships, a pair of armored cruisers, and the protected cruiser Friant. She took part in the annual maneuvers in July and August that year, which consisted of three phases. In the first, she and nine torpedo boats were assigned the task of breaking through a blockade of the Baie de Douarnenez conducted by the rest of the squadron. The ships successfully eluded the blockaders and escaped the bay. The second consisted of an attack on the fortifications of Brest by the entire squadron, and the third saw the fleet conduct an amphibious assault near Douarnenez. She remained in the unit the following year, by which time the unit was completely reorganized. It then consisted of six of the French Navy's older ironclads, a pair of armored cruisers, the protected cruiser Catinat, and three smaller cruisers.

By January 1901, Surcouf and both of her sister ships had been reduced to the reserve fleet, but later that year, she was assigned to the Northern Squadron. That year, the annual fleet maneuvers were conducted from 3 to 28 July. During the exercises, the Northern Squadron steamed south for joint maneuvers with the Mediterranean Squadron. The Northern Squadron ships formed part of the hostile force, and as it was entering the Mediterranean from the Atlantic, represented a German squadron attempting to meet its Italian allies. In 1902, she was sent to join the French squadron in East Asia, which at that time included five other protected cruisers. She had returned to France at some point before 1904, when she was assigned to the Northern Squadron. That year, she was kept in commission for six months, with the rest of the year spent out of service with a reduced crew. While out of service in November and December, she received new boilers. She remained in service with the Northern Squadron through 1908, by which time, the unit consisted of eight armored cruisers and four other protected cruisers.

After the outbreak of World War I in July 1914, Surcouf was allocated to the patrol squadron stationed in Brest, owing to the severe shortage of small cruisers. She remained there until 1916, when she was transferred to the Gulf of Guinea to replace Friant. The following year, she was moved to Gibraltar, where in August she was disarmed and converted into a depot ship. She was thereafter used to support a squadron of submarines that was based in French Morocco, serving in that capacity into 1919, after the end of the war. In 1920, she was moved to Rochefort to serve as a hulk, though she was struck from the naval register on 4 April 1921 and sold on 10 May to M. Jaquart to be broken up.
