= French cruiser Lalande =

Protected cruiser of the French Navy

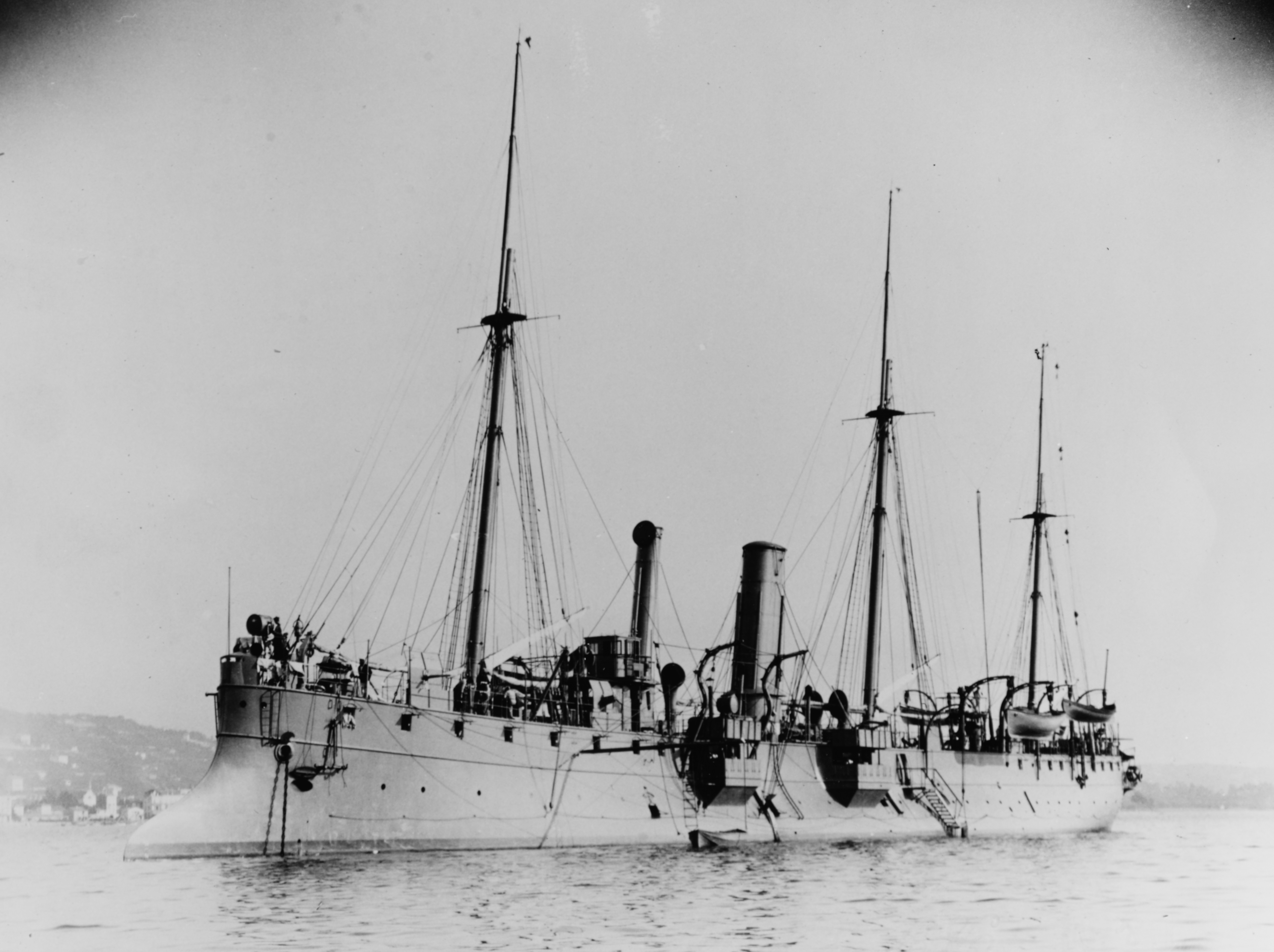
- Lalande early in her career, c. 1890–1892

History

France
- Name: Lalande
- Ordered: 21 March 1887
- Builder: Forges et Chantiers de la Gironde
- Laid down: 6 May 1887
- Launched: 21 March 1889
- Commissioned: 1 November 1889
- Decommissioned: 15 April 1911
- Stricken: 15 April 1911
- Fate: Broken up, 1912

General characteristics
- Class & type: Troude-class protected cruiser
- Displacement: 1,877 t (1,847 long tons; 2,069 short tons)
- Length: 95 m (311 ft 8 in) (lwl)
- Beam: 9.5 m (31 ft 2 in)
- Draft: 4.27 m (14 ft)
- Installed power: 5 × fire-tube boilers; 6,300 ihp (4,700 kW)
- Propulsion: 2 × compound steam engines; 2 × screw propellers
- Speed: 20.5 knots (38.0 km/h; 23.6 mph)
- Range: 2,110 nmi (3,910 km; 2,430 mi) at 10 knots (19 km/h; 12 mph)
- Complement: 200
- Armament: 4 × 138.6 mm (5.46 in) guns; 4 × 47 mm (1.9 in) guns; 4 × 37 mm (1.5 in) Hotchkiss revolver cannon; 4 × 356 mm (14 in) torpedo tubes; 150 naval mines
- Armor: Deck: 40 mm (1.6 in)

Lalande was a protected cruiser of the Troude class built for the French Navy in the late 1880s and early 1890s. The class was built as part of a construction program intended to provide scouts for the main battle fleet. They were based on the preceding Forbin class, the primary improvement being the addition of armor to the conning tower. Lalande was built in the 1880s and was completed in late 1890. She was armed with a main battery of four 138 mm (5.4 in) guns, protected with an armor deck that was 41 mm (1.6 in) thick, and had a top speed of 20.5 knots (38.0 km/h; 23.6 mph).

Lalande served with the Mediterranean Squadron for the first several years of her career, before being reduced to the Reserve Squadron in 1896 and again to the 2nd category of reserve. She temporarily returned to the Mediterranean Squadron in 1898 before once again being placed in reserve later that year, where she remained through 1905. The following year, she joined the Northern Squadron before transferring back to the Mediterranean for 1907 and 1908. She saw little use thereafter and was struck from the naval register in 1912, subsequently being sold to ship breakers for scrap.

== Design ==
Plan and profile drawing of the Troude class

Beginning in 1879, the French Navy's Conseil des Travaux (Council of Works) had requested designs for small but fast cruisers of about 2,000 t (1,968 long tons; 2,205 short tons) displacement that could be used as scouts for the main battle fleet. The unprotected cruiser Milan was the first of the type, which was developed into the Forbin-type of protected cruisers after the Conseil requested light armor protection for the ships. After the first two ships were ordered, the navy requested competing proposals from private shipyards, and the design from Forges et Chantiers de la Gironde was selected, which became the Troude class. In total, six ships were ultimately ordered, three per class; all were very similar. All of the ships were ordered by Admiral Théophile Aube, then the French Minister of Marine and an ardent supporter of the Jeune École doctrine; proponents of the concept favored the use of cruisers to attack an opponent's merchant shipping instead of a fleet of expensive battleships.

Lalande was 95 m (311 ft 8 in) long at the waterline, with a beam of 9.5 m (31 ft 2 in) and an average draft of 4.27 m (14 ft). She displaced 1,877 t (1,847 long tons; 2,069 short tons) as designed. Her crew amounted to 200 officers and enlisted men. The ship's propulsion system consisted of a pair of compound steam engines driving two screw propellers. Steam was provided by five coal-burning fire-tube boilers that were ducted into two funnels. Her machinery was rated to produce 6,300 indicated horsepower (4,700 kW) for a top speed of 20.5 knots (38.0 km/h; 23.6 mph). At a more economical speed of 10 knots (19 km/h; 12 mph), the ship could steam for 2,110 nautical miles (3,910 km; 2,430 mi).

The ship was armed with a main battery of four 138.6 mm (5.46 in) 30-caliber guns in individual pivot mounts, all in sponsons located amidships with two guns per broadside. For close-range defense against torpedo boats, she carried four 47 mm (1.9 in) 3-pounder Hotchkiss guns and four 37 mm (1.5 in) 1-pounder Hotchkiss revolver cannon. She was also armed with four 356 mm (14 in) torpedo tubes in her hull above the waterline, two in the bow and two further aft, one per broadside. She had provisions to carry up to 150 naval mines. Armor protection consisted of a curved armor deck that was 40 mm (1.6 in) thick. Unlike her sisters, Lalande did not receive an armored conning tower. Above the deck, a cofferdam was intended to control flooding from battle damage.

=== Modifications ===
Lalande underwent a series of alterations during her career, primarily focused on updating her armament. In 1893–1894, the ship had her cofferdam replaced by a layer of highly sub-divided watertight compartments that covered the entire width of the deck. A number of other changes were also carried out, including reinforcing the sponsons for the main battery guns, altering the sailing rig, and converting the main battery to quick-firing guns (QF). The latter consisted of converted M1881/84 pattern guns. After November 1895, the bow torpedo tubes were removed. Her sailing rig was reduced in 1902. The light armament was standardized to nine 47 mm guns by 1904, and the remaining torpedo tubes were removed. By this time, her displacement had increased to 1,990 t (1,960 long tons; 2,190 short tons) at full load.

== Service history ==
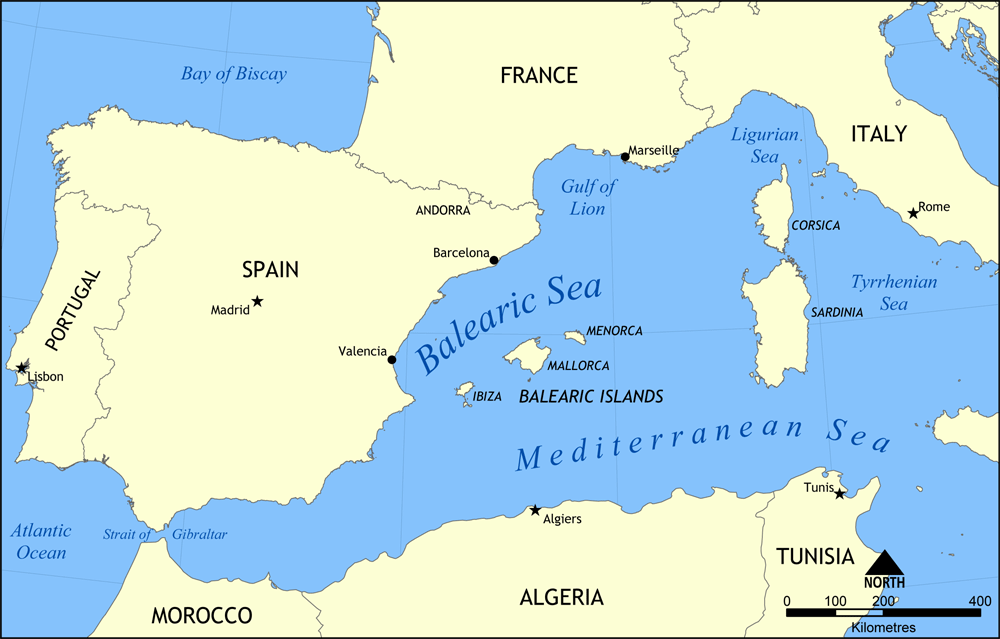
Map of the western Mediterranean, where Lalande operated for much of her career

The navy placed the construction contract on 21 March 1887. The keel for Lalande was laid down at the Forges et Chantiers de la Gironde shipyard in Lormont on 6 May. She was launched on 22 March 1889 and she was moved to Rochefort on 13 April for fitting out. The ship was commissioned for sea trials later that year on 1 November. These continued for more than a year, and she was finally placed in full commission on 25 April 1891, though the trials results were not formally approved until 6 May. Unpon entering service, she was assigned to the Mediterranean Squadron. There, she served as part of the reconnaissance force for the main French battle fleet. In 1892, the unit also included the cruisers Sfax, Amiral Cécille, and Tage. The ship participated in that year's fleet maneuvers, which began on 23 June and concluded on 11 July.

In 1893, Lalande remained with the Mediterranean Squadron. At that time, the unit also included several modern ironclad warships, the armored cruiser Dupuy de Lome, and the protected cruisers Amiral Cécille, Cosmao, Troude, and Jean Bart. Lalande was refitted extensively between OCtober 1893 and May 1894. She thereafter took part in the fleet maneuvers in mid-1894; from 9 to 16 July, the ships involved took on supplies in Toulon for the maneuvers that began later on the 16th. A series of exercises included shooting practice, a blockade simulation, and scouting operations in the western Mediterranean. The maneuvers concluded on 3 August.

She was still serving in the unit in 1895, by which time the fleet's cruiser division consisted of Lalande, her sister ships Troude and Cosmao, Tage, and Suchet. She remained in the Reserve Squadron in 1896. That year, she was reduced to the 2nd category of reserve, along with several old coastal defense ships, ironclads, and other cruisers. They were retained in a state that allowed them to be mobilized in the event of a major war. Lalande was activated to join the Reserve Squadron's cruiser division for the annual 1896 maneuvers, along with Sfax, Amiral Cécille, and the cruisers Milan and Léger. The maneuvers for that year took place from 6 to 30 July and the Reserve Squadron served as the simulated enemy.

Lalande was reactivated in 1898 and assigned to the Mediterranean Squadron. The unit at that time consisted of four pre-dreadnought battleships, four ironclads, two armored cruisers, and three other protected cruisers, among other smaller vessels. She took part in the maneuvers that year, which lasted from 5 to 25 July. The ship was placed in the 2nd category of reserve in Toulon later that year. Lalande and her sister ships had been deactivated and placed in the reserve fleet by January 1901. Between 1902 and 1905, the ship received new boilers at Rochefort. She was reactivated in 1906 and assigned to the Mediterranean Squadron. She took part in the fleet maneuvers that year, which began on 6 July with the concentration of the Northern and Mediterranean Squadrons in Algiers. The maneuvers were conducted in the western Mediterranean, alternating between ports in French North Africa and Toulon and Marseille, France, and concluding on 4 August. She was present for a naval review in Marseille on 16 September with elements of the Mediterranean Squadron.

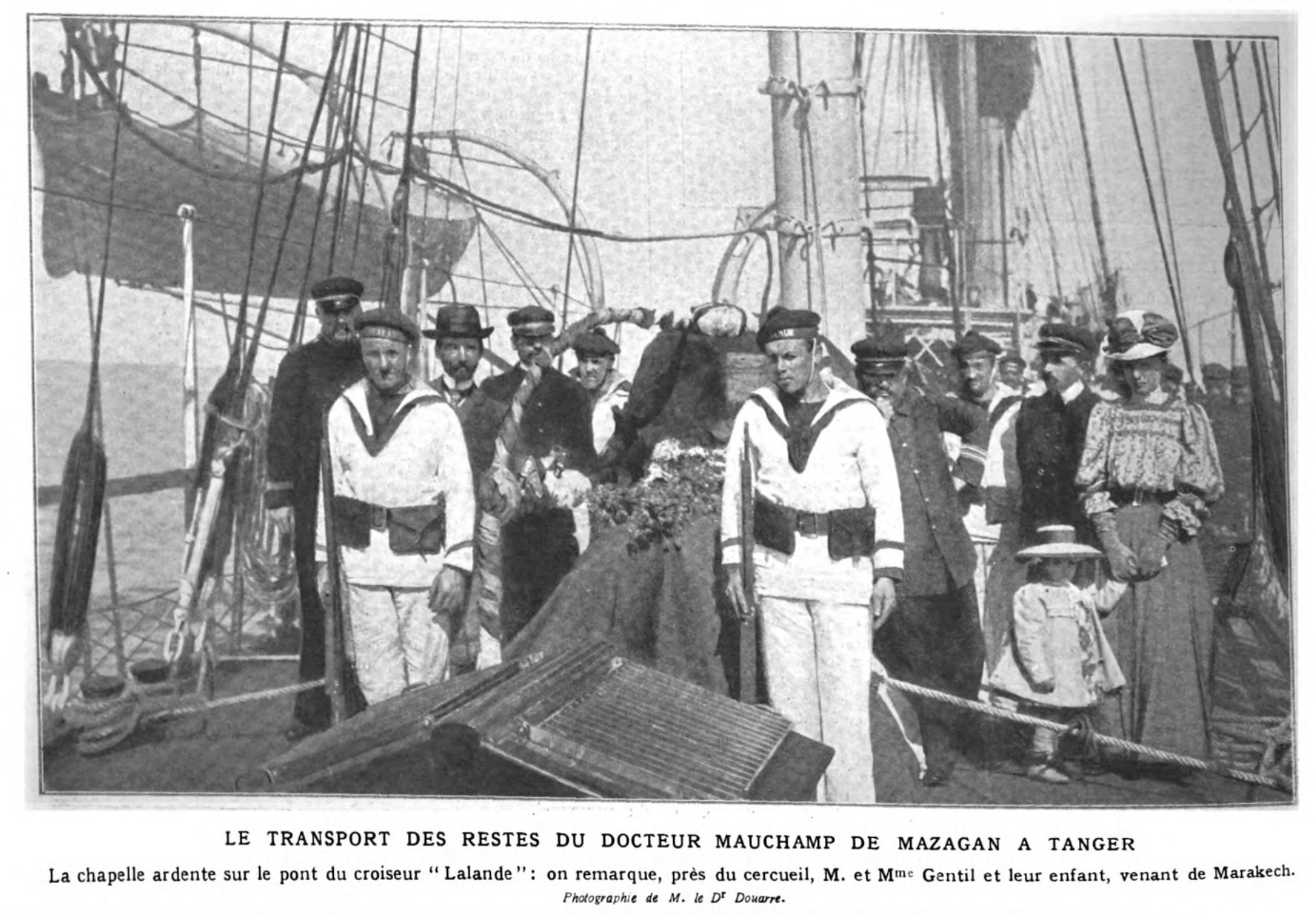
The coffin of Émile Mauchamp transported aboard Lalande from Mazagan to Tangier in 1907

She remained in service with the Mediterranean Squadron in 1907, and in 1908. Lalande was placed in special reserve on 18 February 1909 in Bizerte in French Tunisia so that she could be re-boilered once again, but on 3 November, the work was postponed before ultimately being cancelled on 17 June 1910. The navy instead decided to discard the ship, and she was decommissioned on 15 April 1911. Struck from the naval register the same day, she was placed for sale on 14 August 1912 and was eventually sold to M. Boccarra on 13 October, and she was subsequently broken up for scrap.
