= French ship Cosmao =

At least two ships of the French Navy have borne the name Cosmao:

- French corvette Cosmao, a Cosmao-class corvette launched in 1861 and stricken in 1881
- French cruiser Cosmao, a Troude-class cruiser launched in 1889 and stricken in 1922
