= Troude =

Troude is a French surname originating in Normandy. It may refer to

- Amable Troude (1762–1824), a counter admiral
  - Amable-Emmanuel Troude (1803–1885), his son, colonel and lexicographer
  - Onésime-Joachim Troude (1807–1886), his son, frigate captain and writer
- Laurent Troude (1968–2018), a journalist
- Troude-class cruiser, a group of protected cruisers
