= French cruiser Amiral Cécille =

Protected cruiser of the French Navy

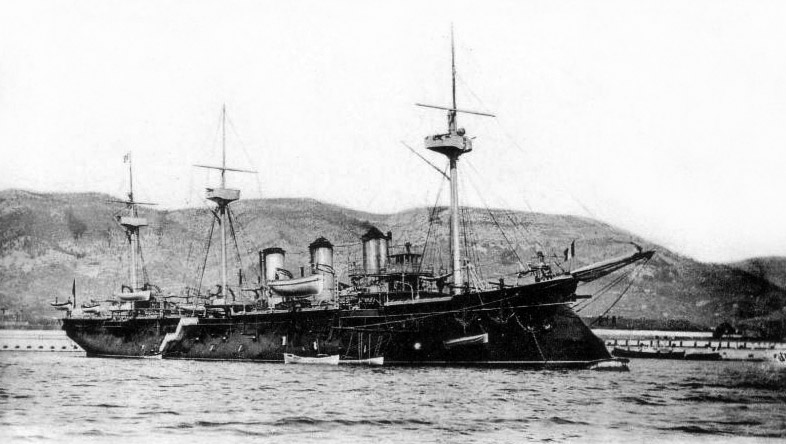
- Amiral Cécille at anchor

Class overview
- Preceded by: Tage
- Succeeded by: Davout

History

France
- Name: Amiral Cécille
- Namesake: Jean-Baptiste Cécille
- Ordered: 23 November 1885
- Laid down: 1 September 1886
- Launched: 3 May 1888
- Commissioned: 26 January 1889
- Decommissioned: 24 September 1906
- Stricken: 27 August 1907
- Fate: Broken up, 1919

General characteristics
- Type: Protected cruiser
- Displacement: 5,790.3 t (5,698.9 long tons; 6,382.7 short tons)
- Length: 122.4 m (401 ft 7 in) loa
- Beam: 15.03 m (49 ft 4 in)
- Draft: 6.03 m (19 ft 9 in)
- Installed power: 12 × fire-tube boilers; 10,200 indicated horsepower (7,600 kW)
- Propulsion: 4 × compound steam engines; 2 × screw propellers
- Speed: 19 knots (35 km/h; 22 mph)
- Range: 2,850 nmi (5,280 km; 3,280 mi) at 10 knots (19 km/h; 12 mph)
- Crew: 486
- Armament: 8 × 164.7 mm (6.48 in) guns; 10 × 138.6 mm (5.46 in) guns; 6 × 47 mm (1.9 in) Hotchkiss guns; 14 × 37 mm (1.5 in) Hotchkiss revolver cannon; 4 × 356 mm (14 in) torpedo tubes
- Armor: Deck: 56 to 102 mm (2.2 to 4 in); Conning tower: 89 mm (3.5 in)

Amiral Cécille was a protected cruiser of the French Navy, named in honour of Jean-Baptiste Cécille. The third vessel of that type built in France, her design was derived from her two predecessors, Sfax and Tage. Like those vessels, Amiral Cécille was intended to be used as a commerce raider to attack merchant shipping. As such, she carried a barque sailing rig to supplement her steam engines for long voyages overseas. Amiral Cécille was armed with a main battery of eight 164 mm (6.5 in) guns and had a curved armor deck that was 56 to 102 mm (2.2 to 4 in) thick.

Amiral Cécille had a relatively uneventful career. She spent the early 1890s with the main fleet in the Mediterranean Squadron, where she was primarily occupied with training exercises. After being overhauled in the mid-1890s, she was transferred to the Reserve Squadron in the Mediterranean, where she continued to participate in training maneuvers. The ship detached to join the Naval Division of the Atlantic Ocean in 1899, where she served for the next three years. Recalled home in 1902, she saw no further active service and she was hulked in 1907, before being broken up in 1919.

== Design ==
In 1878, the French Navy embarked on a program of cruiser construction authorized by the Conseil des Travaux (Council of Works) for a strategy aimed at attacking British merchant shipping in the event of war. The program called for ships of around 3,000 long tons (3,048 t) with a speed of 16 knots (30 km/h; 18 mph). The first four vessels of the program were wood-hulled unprotected cruisers. A fifth vessel, to have been named Capitaine Lucas, was originally intended along the same lines, but was cancelled in favor of an alternate design by Louis-Émile Bertin, Sfax, the first protected cruiser of the French fleet. Sfax provided the basis for a pair of similar follow-on ships, Tage and Amiral Cécille, both of which were ordered in 1885, though neither was designed by Bertin.

The design for Amiral Cécille was prepared by the naval engineer Antoine Lagane, who was the director of the Société Nouvelle des Forges et Chantiers de la Méditerranée shipyard in La Seyne-sur-Mer. Lagane submitted it to the Minister of the Navy, Rear Admiral Charles-Eugène Galiber, on 8 April 1885. Lagane designed the cruiser to meet the requirements the Conseil des Travaux had issued in 1884, most significantly a minimum speed of 19 knots (35 km/h; 22 mph). He adopted the same armament that had been used aboard Sfax—six 164.7 mm (6.48 in) guns and ten 138.6 mm (5.46 in) guns. Galiber in turn forwarded Lagane's proposal to the Conseil on 17 June, who considered it in a meeting on 7 July. After making minor revisions, primarily to the thickness of the deck armor, (Note: Lagane had reduced its thickness at the bow and stern to save weight in less critical areas, but the Conseil requested a uniform thickness.) they approved the design and placed the construction contract on 23 November. On 6 July 1889, while the ship was undergoing sea trials, the navy decided to increase the number of 164.7 mm guns by two, which were installed later that year before she was accepted for active service.

=== General characteristics and machinery ===
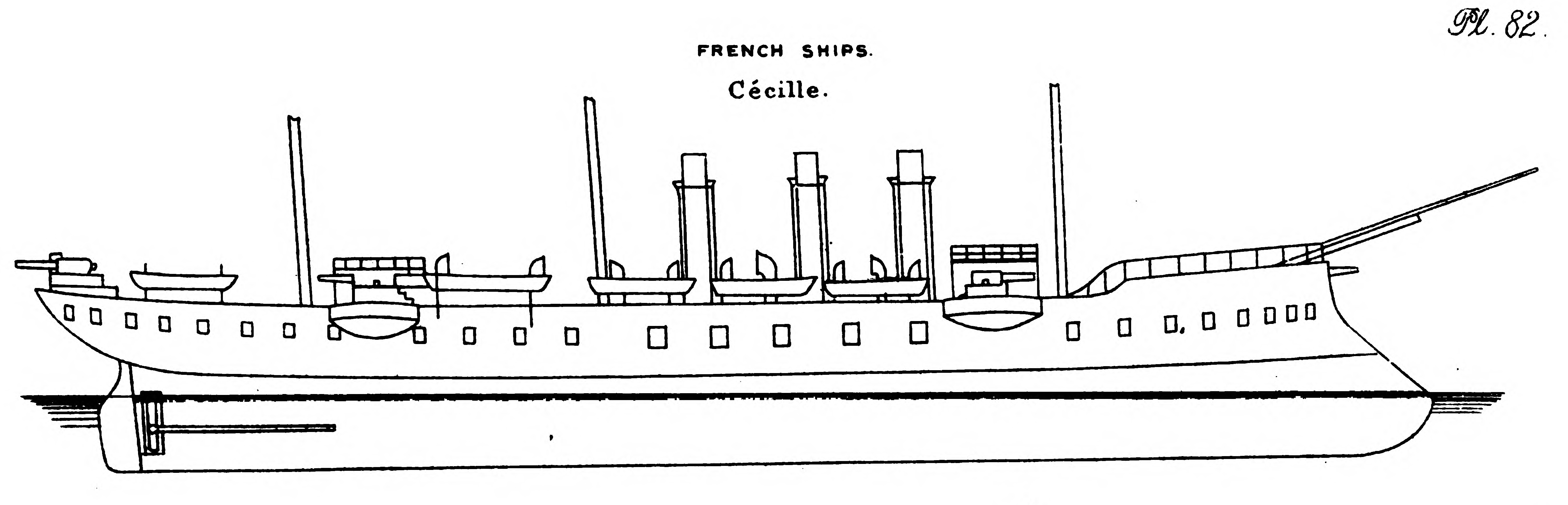
Profile drawing of Amiral Cécille as depicted in The Naval Annual in 1887; note it mistakenly omits the amidships sponson for the main battery, which was located abreast the rear funnel

The ship was 115.5 m (378 ft 11 in) long between perpendiculars, 117.6 m (386 ft) long at the waterline, and 122.4 m (401 ft 7 in) long overall. She had a beam of 15.03 m (49 ft 4 in) and an average draft of 6.03 m (19 ft 9 in), which increased to 6.81 m (22.3 ft) aft. She displaced 5,790.3 t (5,698.9 long tons; 6,382.7 short tons) as designed and up to 6,137 t (6,040 long tons; 6,765 short tons) at full load as measured in 1900. As was typical for French warships of the period, she had a pronounced tumblehome shape and an overhanging stern. Her superstructure was minimal, consisting primarily of a small conning tower forward. Her hull featured a pronounced ram bow and a short forecastle. Unlike Sfax, Amiral Cécille's bow was not reinforced, so the ram could only be used against light vessels. Her crew consisted of 486 officers and enlisted men, but while serving as a flagship later in her career, this figure increased to 557 to account for the admiral's staff.

The propulsion system for Amiral Cécille consisted of four vertical 2-cylinder compound steam engines that were paired to drive two 4-bladed, bronze screw propellers. Steam was provided by twelve coal-fired, double-ended fire-tube boilers that were ducted into three funnels located amidships. To supplement the steam engines on long voyages, she was originally fitted with a barque sailing rig without royals, with three masts. The power plant was rated to produce 10,200 indicated horsepower (7,600 kW) for a top speed of 19 knots (35 km/h; 22 mph), and on her initial speed trials, the ship reached 10,680 ihp (7,960 kW) for 19.44 knots (36.00 km/h; 22.37 mph). Coal storage amounted to 717 t (706 long tons; 790 short tons) normally and 850 t (840 long tons; 940 short tons) fully loaded. Her cruising radius using only her engines was 2,868 nautical miles (5,312 km; 3,300 mi) at a speed of 10 knots (19 km/h; 12 mph) with a normal load of coal and 3,400 nmi (6,300 km; 3,900 mi) with a full load. But the ship's propulsion system proved to burn coal at a greater rate than expected, and she never exceeded 2,850 nmi (5,280 km; 3,280 mi) with a normal load in service.

=== Armament and armor ===
Illustration of Amiral Cécille

Amiral Cécille was armed with a main battery of eight 164.7 mm (6.48 in) M1881 30-caliber (cal.) guns carried in individual pivot mounts. Six of the guns were mounted in sponsons on the upper deck, three on each broadside. One gun was placed in the bow under the forecastle and the other was at the stern on the upper deck as chase guns. These weapons were supported by a secondary battery of ten 138.6 mm (5.46 in) M1881 30 cal. guns that were carried in a main deck battery amidships, five guns per broadside with individual gun ports. For close-range defense against torpedo boats, she carried six 47 mm (1.9 in) M1885 3-pounder Hotchkiss guns and fourteen 37 mm (1.5 in) 1-pounder Hotchkiss revolver cannon, all in individual mounts. She also carried four 356 mm (14 in) torpedo tubes in her hull above the waterline. One was in the bow, one on each broadside, and one in the stern.

The ship was protected by a wrought iron armor deck that was 40 mm (1.6 in) on the flat portion, running from end to end of the ship, and layered on 10 mm (0.39 in) of hull plating. Toward the sides of the ship, the deck sloped down and increased in thickness to 90 mm (4 in) at the top and tapering slightly to 85 mm (3.3 in) where the deck met the sides of the hull. The sloped sides were layered on 15 mm (0.59 in) of hull plating, and terminated at the hull 1.30 m (4 ft 3 in) below the waterline. The main deck battery had transverse bulkheads that were 80 mm (3.1 in) on either end, and her conning tower had the same thickness of armor plate on its sides.

=== Modifications ===
In 1893, Amiral Cécille received a new suite of primary and secondary guns of the same calibers, but updated to quick-firing types; both 30-caliber M1884 variants. The ship's sailing rig was cut down in 1895 and then removed altogether shortly thereafter, and the bow torpedo tube was removed in 1898. After 1900, a pair of 65 mm (2.6 in) field guns were placed on the ship, which could be sent ashore with a landing party. The light armament was also revised: the number of 47 mm M1885 guns was increased from six to twelve and the 37 mm guns were removed. After she was reduced to a training ship for torpedo boat crews in 1907, she had three deck-mounted torpedo tubes installed toward the bow on the starboard side, including a 356 mm, a 381 mm (15 in), and a 450 mm (17.7 in) weapon.

== Service history ==
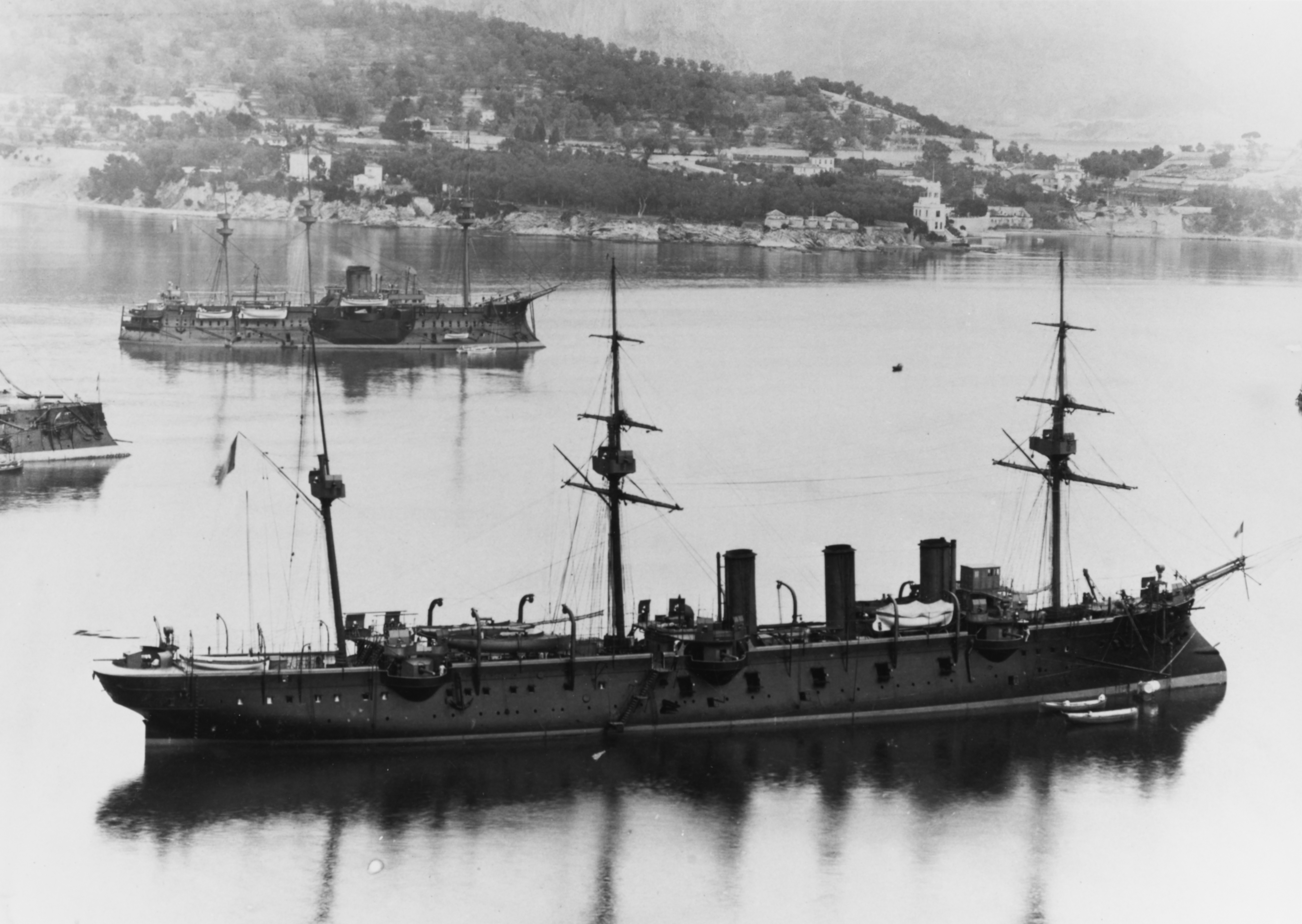
Amiral Cécille in Villefranche-sur-Mer in late 1890 or 1891

The keel for Amiral Cécille was laid down at the Société Nouvelle des Forges et Chantiers de la Méditerranée shipyard in La Seyne-sur-Mer on 1 September 1886 and her completed hull was launched on 3 May 1888. Named for Admiral Jean-Baptiste Cécille, who saw service in East Asia in the 1840s, the ship was commissioned to begin sea trials on 26 January 1889. The results of her testing were approved on 9 October 1890 and she was placed in full commission the same day. The ship participated in the 1891 fleet maneuvers with the Mediterranean Squadron as part of the cruiser division, along with Tage, the protected cruiser Lalande, and the torpedo cruiser Vautour. The maneuvers began on 22 June and lasted until 11 July, during which Amiral Cécille operated as part of a hostile fleet attempting to attack the French Mediterranean coast. The maneuvers highlighted the shortage of cruisers sufficiently fast to scout for the main fleet; only Amiral Cécille and Tage were deemed suitable for the task in the evaluation of the exercises.

By 1893, Amiral Cécille had been joined in the Mediterranean Squadron's reconnaissance force by the new armored cruiser Dupuy de Lôme and the protected cruiser Jean Bart. On 25 July, Amiral Cécille accidentally rammed a British freighter that passed in front of her too closely; the latter sank in the collision and Amiral Cécille suffered significant damage to her bow. Repairs were carried out between September 1893 and July 1894 at La Seyne-sur-Mer. During that period, her armament was updated and she had a major overhaul of her boilers. The work was completed in 1895, allowing her to take part in that year's maneuvers as part of Fleet C, along with four ironclads, three other cruisers, and several smaller torpedo craft. The exercises lasted from 1 to 27 July, and on the 15th, Amiral Cécille's propulsion system broke down and she had to return to Toulon for repairs. By 1896, Amiral Cécille had been moved to the Reserve Squadron as part of its cruiser division, along with Sfax, Lalande, and the unprotected cruiser Milan and the torpedo gunboat Léger. The maneuvers for that year took place from 6 to 30 July and the Reserve Squadron served as the simulated enemy.

In 1899, Amiral Cécille was sent to replace the cruiser Dubourdieu on the Naval Division of the Atlantic Ocean, where she joined Sfax. In late January 1900 she left Fort-de-France, Martinique, for the west coast of Africa. Later that year, the Atlantic Station was reinforced by the protected cruisers Suchet, D'Assas, and Troude, though Sfax was ordered to return home. The flotilla assigned to the Atlantic was reduced to Amiral Cécille, Suchet, and the cruiser D'Estrées in 1901. The ship was recalled home in 1902, had her boilers overhaulled that year, and Amiral Cécille saw no further active service, being assigned to the Special Reserve on 9 January 1903. She was decommissioned on 24 September 1906, struck from the naval register on 27 August 1907, and converted into a hulk the next year to support the school for torpedo boat engine room crews, replacing the old ship of the line Algésiras, which had accidentally been destroyed by fire. In 1910, she was reassigned to the torpedo school at Toulon, replacing the ironclad Marceau, and serving in that role until 1 May 1912. She was then employed as a barracks ship and hulk at Toulon through 1917, replacing the old steam frigate Guerrière. Amiral Cécille was ultimately listed for sale on 15 March 1919 and was sold to M. Saglia on 21 July to be broken up.
