= Forbin-class cruiser =

Protected cruiser class of the French Navy

- Coëtlogon at anchor

Class overview
- Name: Forbin class
- Operators: French Navy
- Preceded by: Suchet
- Succeeded by: Troude class
- Built: 1886–1894
- In service: 1889–1921
- Completed: 3
- Retired: 3

General characteristics
- Type: Protected cruiser
- Displacement: 1,857 t (1,828 long tons; 2,047 short tons)
- Length: 96.1 m (315 ft 3 in) loa
- Beam: 9.33 m (30 ft 7 in)
- Draft: 4.5 m (14 ft 9 in)
- Installed power: 6 × fire-tube boilers; 6,200 ihp (4,600 kW)
- Propulsion: 2 × compound steam engines; 2 × screw propellers
- Sail plan: Schooner rig
- Speed: 20 knots (37 km/h; 23 mph)
- Range: 2,400 nmi (4,400 km; 2,800 mi) at 10 knots (19 km/h; 12 mph)
- Complement: 209
- Armament: 4 × 138.6 mm (5.46 in) guns; 3 × 47 mm (1.9 in) guns; 4 × 37 mm (1.5 in) Hotchkiss revolver cannon; 4 × 356 mm (14 in) torpedo tubes
- Armor: Deck: 40 mm (1.6 in)

The Forbin class was a group of three protected cruisers built for the French Navy in the late 1880s and early 1890s. The class comprised Forbin, Coëtlogon, and Surcouf. They were ordered as part of a fleet program that, in accordance with the theories of the Jeune École, proposed a fleet based on cruisers and torpedo boats to defend France. The Forbin-class cruisers were intended to serve as flotilla leaders for the torpedo boats, and they were armed with a main battery of four 138 mm (5.4 in) guns.

Forbin spent most of her career in the Mediterranean in the Reserve Squadron, while Surcouf served in the Northern Squadron in the English Channel. Coëtlogon suffered from machinery problems that significantly delayed her completion, and after finally entering service in 1894, joined Surcouf in the Northern Squadron. All three ships were in reserve by 1901. Coëtlogon was discarded in 1906, while Forbin was converted into a collier in 1913. Surcouf was the only member of the class still in active service during World War I, and she was deployed later in the conflict to the Gulf of Guinea. Forbin was scrapped in 1919 and Surcouf was sold to ship breakers two years later.

== Design ==
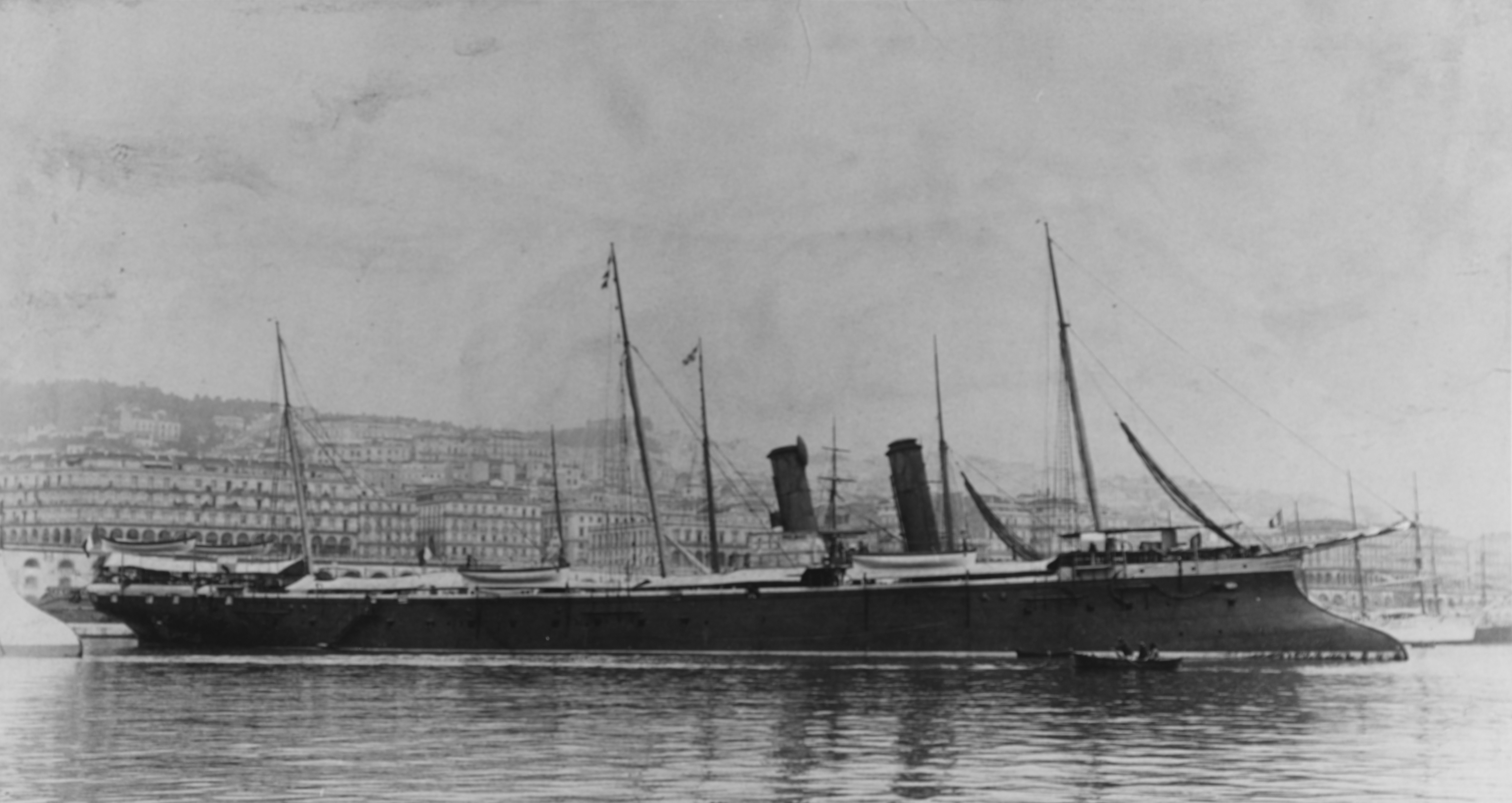
The unprotected cruiser Milan, the predecessor to the Forbin class

By the late 1870s, the unprotected cruisers and avisos the French Navy had built as fleet scouts were becoming obsolescent, particularly as a result of their low speed of 12 to 14 knots (22 to 26 km/h; 14 to 16 mph), which rendered them too slow to be effective scouts. Beginning in 1879, the Conseil des Travaux (Council of Works) had requested designs for small but fast cruisers of about 2,000 long tons (2,032 t) displacement that could be used as scouts for the main battle fleet or to lead squadrons of torpedo boats. The naval engineer Louis-Émile Bertin had advocated for just such a vessel since 1875, and his design became the cruiser Milan. Bertin's design would eventually be developed into the Forbin-type of protected cruisers.

In the early 1880s, the Jeune École doctrine, which envisioned using a combination of cruisers and torpedo boats to defend France and attack enemy merchant shipping, became popular in French naval circles. In early 1886, the Jeune École supporter Gabriel Charmes published his book La réforme de la Marine (The Reform of the Navy), in which he called for small commerce raiding cruisers armed with a pair of 138.6 mm (5.46 in) guns—sufficient for the task of sinking merchant vessels—and a speed of 20 knots (37 km/h; 23 mph), which would allow them to escape any stronger vessel. Admiral Théophile Aube, an ardent supporter of the Jeune École, had become the Naval Minister at the same time. He requested on 1 February 1886 just such a vessel from Marie de Bussy, the Inspector General of Naval Engineering. The following day, de Bussy submitted a set of specifications to meet Aube's requirements; these included a speed of at least 19.5 knots (36.1 km/h; 22.4 mph), a range of 2,400 nautical miles (4,400 km; 2,800 mi) at a speed of 10 knots (19 km/h; 12 mph), two 138.6 mm guns, and a 40 mm (1.6 in) curved armor deck. Over the following month, de Bussy prepared a more detailed design based on these specifications, which Aube approved on 20 March. Three of the vessels were allocated to the 1887 budget, which included a number of other cruisers, all of which were part of Aube's program to equip the French fleet with a number of commerce raiders.

The first two vessels of the 1887 budget—Forbin and Surcouf—were built in government shipyards according to de Bussy's plans, but for the third vessel, he issued the requirements prepared in February to private shipyards for competing designs. Five yards responded by 30 April 1886, and the proposal from Forges et Chantiers de la Gironde was selected; this vessel became Troude, the first member of the Troude class. By this time, an extraordinary budget was passed for 1887 that included three more small cruisers. One of these, Coëtlogon, was ordered to de Bussy's design, while the other two became Troude-class cruisers. As work on the Forbin-class ships progressed, the design was altered. The ships were intended to have five torpedo tubes, but on 23 June 1887, the fifth tube, which was to have been placed in the stern, was deleted. Forbin was completed in 1888 with the original armament, but just two main battery guns was found to be insufficient, particularly compared to foreign counterparts, and so another pair of guns was added before Forbin entered active service and the other two vessels were completed.

=== Characteristics ===
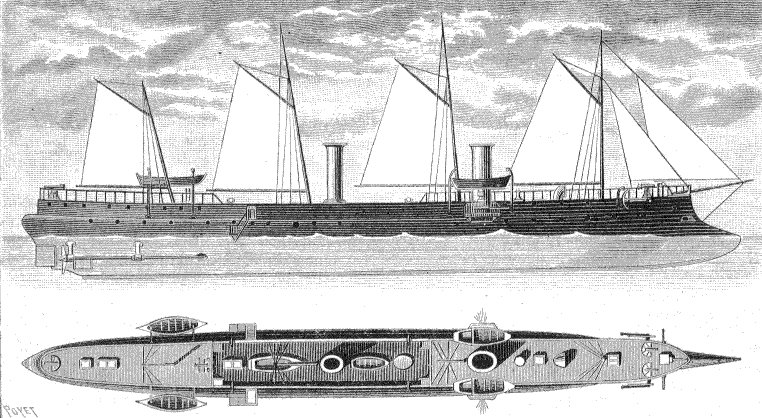
Profile drawing of an early version of the Forbin design, depicting the original four-masted rig

The ships of the Forbin class were 95 m (311 ft 8 in) long at the waterline and 96.1 m (315 ft 3 in) long overall, with a beam of 9.33 m (30 ft 7 in) and an average draft of 4.5 m (14 ft 9 in), increasing to 5.4 m (17 ft 9 in) aft. They displaced 1,857 t (1,828 long tons; 2,047 short tons) as completed. Their hulls had a tumblehome shape and featured a pronounced ram bow, though it was not actually intended to be used for ramming attacks. The ships' superstructure was minimal, consisting primarily of a small bridge structure. Their crew amounted to 209 officers and enlisted men.

The ship's propulsion system consisted of a pair of horizontal, 2-cylinder compound steam engines driving two screw propellers. Steam was provided by six coal-burning fire-tube boilers that were ducted into two funnels. Their machinery was rated to produce 6,200 indicated horsepower (4,600 kW) for a top speed of 20 knots, though on speed trials they all exceeded these speeds, reaching between 20.33 and 20.64 knots (37.65 and 38.23 km/h; 23.40 and 23.75 mph) from 5,918 to 6,208 ihp (4,413 to 4,629 kW). Coal storage amounted to 200 t (200 long tons; 220 short tons) normally and up to 298 t (293 long tons; 328 short tons) at full load, which allowed the ships to steam for 2,395 nautical miles (4,436 km; 2,756 mi) at a speed of 10 knots. To supplement the steam engines on long voyages overseas, the ships were originally design with a four-masted schooner rig; Forbin was completed that way, but the sails proved to have limited use during her trials, so she was converted to a three-masted schooner rig. The other two ships were modified during construction to match. The arrangement had a total surface area of 412.27 m^{2} (4,437.6 sq ft).

The ships were armed with a main battery of four 138 mm (5.4 in) 30-caliber M1881 guns in individual pivot mounts, all in sponsons in the upper deck, with two guns per broadside. Forbin was originally completed with just two of the guns, but had the remaining pair installed during her trials period. The sponsons proved to be weakly constructed and were susceptible to damage from heavy seas, though Coëtlogon's were better than the other two ships'. For close-range defense against torpedo boats, they carried three 47 mm (1.9 in) M1885 3-pounder Hotchkiss guns and four 37 mm (1.5 in) 1-pounder Hotchkiss revolver cannon. They were also armed with four 356 mm (14 in) torpedo tubes in her hull above the waterline. Two tubes were in the bow and the other two were on the side of the hull, one per broadside. The ships had provisions to carry up to 150 naval mines.

Armor protection consisted of a curved armor deck that was 40 mm (1.6 in) thick. The deck was wrought iron that sloped down at the sides to provide a measure of vertical protection. Above the deck, a layer of highly sub-divided watertight compartments was added to control flooding in the event of battle damage. Below the deck and above the engine and boiler rooms was a 7 mm (0.28 in) anti-splinter deck to protect the machinery from shell fragments. All of the guns were initially fitted with gun shields.

=== Modifications ===
Coëtlogon after her reduction in her masts, c. 1893–1905

The members of the class underwent repeated and differing refits over the course of their careers. Almost immediately after entering service, all three ships had an armored conning tower installed between 1889 and 1890. Forbin's conning tower had 54 mm (2.1 in) sides, while the other two ships received 40 mm plating on their towers. Between 1890 and 1893, all three ships received updates to their armament, and all three ships had their rigging altered. Forbin and Coëtlogon had their main mast removed, along with their pole bowsprit; their fore and mizzenmasts were moved closer together. Surcouf only lost her mainmast during that refit. By the time work was completed, all three ships had quick-firing guns for their main battery, and two 47 mm guns were added in exchange for the removal of one of the 37 mm guns. The main guns aboard Forbin were simply converted to quick firing, while Surcouf received the updated M1884 variant, which was also quick firing. Whether Coëtlogon's guns were simply upgraded or replaced is not recorded. The main guns were supplied with a variety of shells, including solid cast iron projectiles and explosive armor-piercing shells, both of which weighed 30 kg (66 lb). The M1884 guns fired with a muzzle velocity of 590 m/s (1,900 ft/s). As refitted, Forbin's displacement had increased to 1,966 t (1,935 long tons; 2,167 short tons), Surcouf's to 2,047 t (2,015 long tons; 2,256 short tons), and that for Coëtlogon to 1,932 t (1,901 long tons; 2,130 short tons).

In 1895, the navy ordered that the bow torpedo tubes be removed from all three ships, and the work was carried out the following year. At the same time, the gun shields for the 47 mm and 37 mm guns were removed. Another major refit was carried out between 1905 and 1906. The remaining sailing rigs were removed from all three ships, and the armament was revised again. Forbin retained her main battery, but her light guns were standardized to nine 47 mm guns. Surcouf was the same, though she carried just seven of the 47 guns. Both ships kept a pair of 37 mm guns for their boats. Coëtlogon, which had been decommissioned in 1905, was not updated. All three ships had their remaining torpedo tubes removed at that time. At some point during their careers, Forbin and Surcouf had their boilers modified to accept mixed coal and oil fuel.

In 1916, Surcouf, the sole remaining member of the class still in active service, received two 47 mm anti-aircraft guns on her forward upper deck. After being reduced to a hulk in August 1917, she was disarmed. The following year, Forbin was converted into a replenishment hulk. Her propulsion system was removed to open space for a coal storage hold capable of carrying 1,250 t (1,230 long tons; 1,380 short tons) of coal. Eight cranes were installed to transfer coal to other vessels.

== Construction ==
Coëtlogon had serious problems with her propulsion system, which significantly delayed her completion. She began sea trials in 1891 that revealed the defects and led to a complete replacement of the engines. The new engines also had problems, including severe vibration, and Coëtlogon was finally able to complete her trials and enter fleet service in 1895.

Construction data
Name	Shipyard	Laid down	Launched	Commissioned
Forbin	Arsenal de Rochefort, Rochefort	May 1886	14 January 1888	1 February 1889
Surcouf	Arsenal de Cherbourg, Cherbourg	4 October 1886	9 October 1889	10 October 1890
Coëtlogon	Ateliers et Chantiers de Saint-Nazaire Penhoët, Saint-Nazaire	27 May 1887	3 December 1888	20 September 1894

== Service history ==
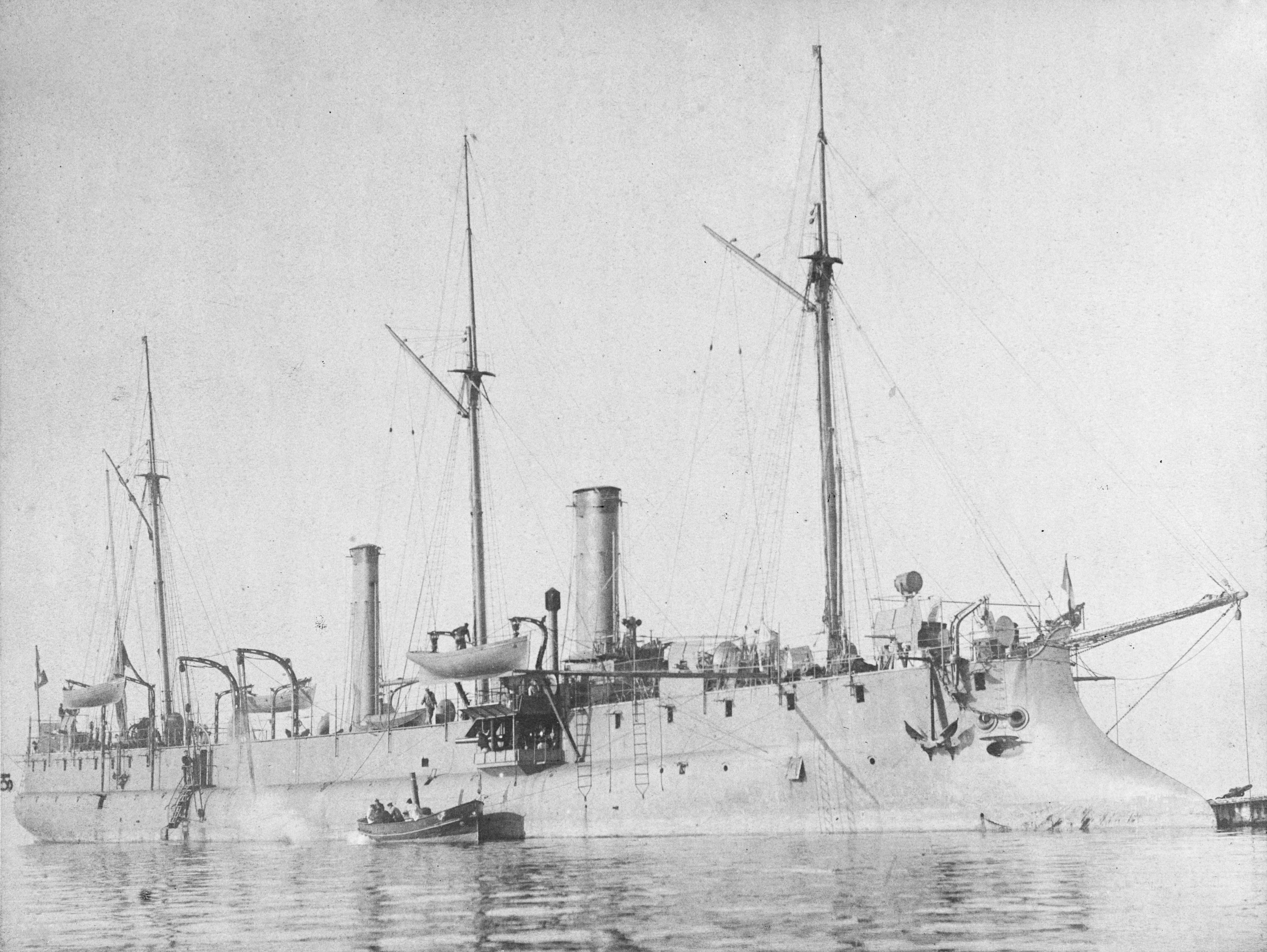
Forbin in around 1890

Forbin was initially placed in the Mediterranean Squadron, before later being transferred to the Reserve Squadron, where she was activated periodically to participate in training exercises with the ships of the Mediterranean Squadron. Surcouf was assigned to the Northern Squadron in the English Channel; Coëtlogon joined her there after finally entering service in 1895. During this period, the ships were primarily occupied with training exercises; during one set of maneuvers in 1894, Forbin had to tow a torpedo boat back to port after it was damaged in a collision with another vessel. Surcouf was placed in the 2nd category of reserve in 1896, but she was reactivated the following year for exercises with the Northern Squadron. Coëtlogon served with the Northern Squadron until August 1896, when she was placed in reserve in Lorient; she saw no further active service.

Surcouf remained in service with the Northern Squadron through 1899. All three ships were reduced to reserve by 1901. That year, Forbin suffered an ammunition fire that resulted from unstable Poudre B charges. In 1902, Surcouf was deployed to East Asia, and she returned to France by 1904 for another stint with the Northern Squadron. She remained there through 1908. Coëtlogon, which was not a successful vessel, was decommissioned in June 1905, struck from the naval register in August, sold to be broken up in August 1906.

Forbin was reactivated in 1906 for service in the Northern Squadron. Forbin had been moved to the Moroccan Naval Division in 1911 and was converted into a collier two years later. In 1916 during World War I, Surcouf was sent to the Gulf of Guinea to patrol for German vessels, remaining there until the end of the war. While there, she landed some of her light guns to strengthen forces ashore. Forbin was converted into a coal storage hulk for the main French fleet at Corfu, while Surcouf was used as a support hulk for a submarine squadron based at Gibraltar from 1917. Forbin was towed to Piraeus, Greece, after the war in 1919 to be scrapped there, and Surcouf was broken up at Rochefort in 1921.
