= French cruiser Tage =

Protected cruiser of the French Navy

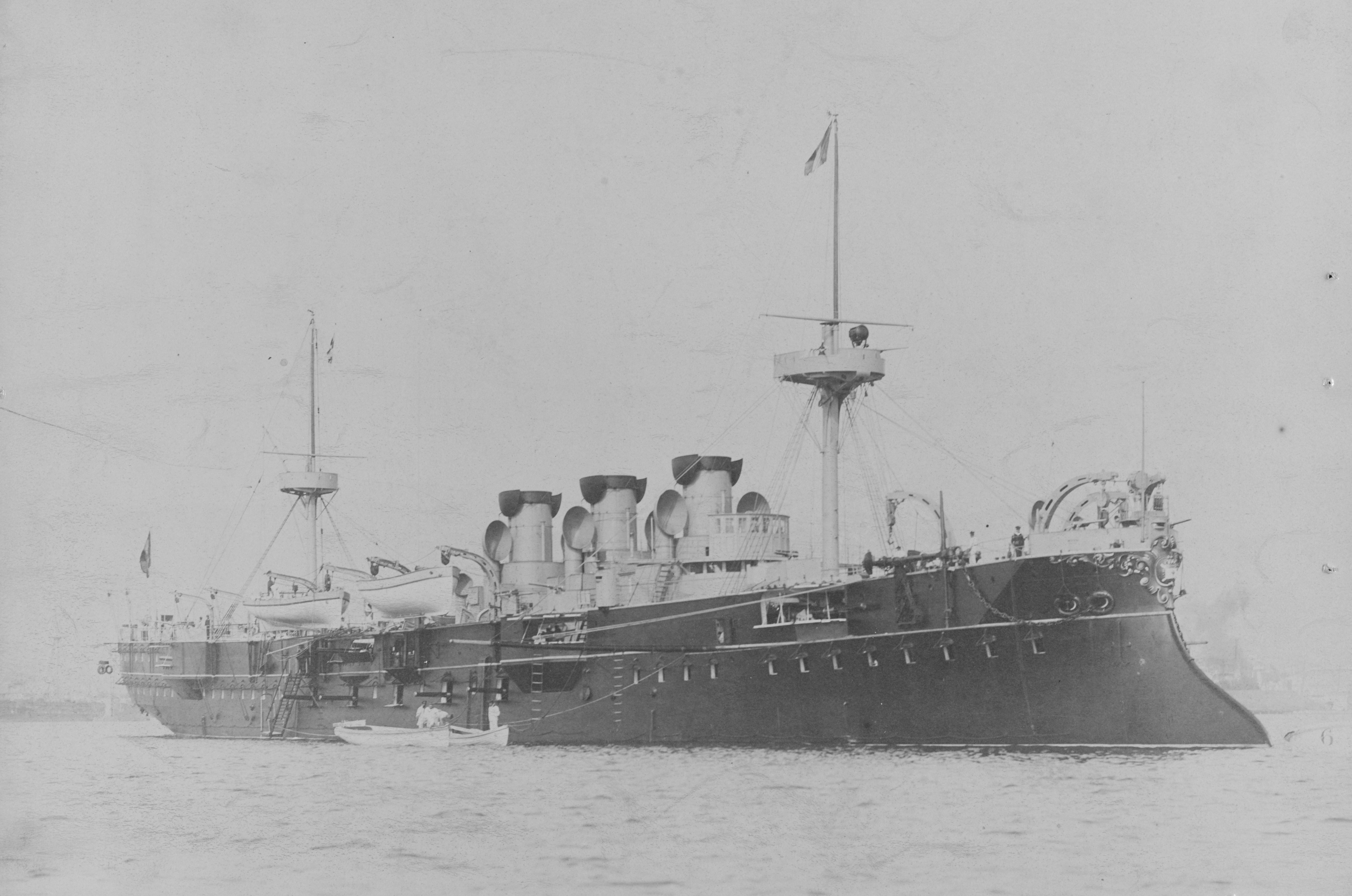
- Tage after her 1892–1893 refit

Class overview
- Preceded by: Sfax
- Succeeded by: Amiral Cécille

History

France
- Name: Tage
- Ordered: 1885
- Builder: Ateliers et Chantiers de la Loire
- Laid down: August 1885
- Launched: 28 October 1886
- Commissioned: 1 March 1889
- Stricken: 7 June 1907
- Fate: Broken up, 1910

General characteristics
- Type: Protected cruiser
- Displacement: 7,469 long tons (7,589 t)
- Length: 118.87 m (390 ft) loa
- Beam: 16.3 m (53 ft 6 in)
- Draft: 7.67 m (25 ft 2 in)
- Installed power: 12 × fire-tube boilers; 12,500 indicated horsepower (9,300 kW)
- Propulsion: 2 × triple-expansion steam engines; 2 × screw propellers
- Speed: 19.2 knots (35.6 km/h; 22.1 mph)
- Complement: 538
- Armament: 6 × 164.7 mm (6.48 in) guns; 10 × 138.6 mm (5.46 in) guns; 3 × 47 mm (1.9 in) Hotchkiss guns; 1 × 47 mm Hotchkiss revolver cannon; 14 × 37 mm (1.5 in) Hotchkiss revolver cannon; 7 × 356 mm (14 in) torpedo tubes
- Armor: Deck: 40 to 80 mm (1.6 to 3.1 in); Conning tower: 80 mm

Tage was a protected cruiser built for the French Navy in the 1880s, the second vessel of that type built for the French fleet. The design was based on the previous cruiser, Sfax, and like that vessel, Tage was intended to be used as a commerce raider to attack merchant shipping. As such, she carried a barque sailing rig to supplement her steam engines for long voyages overseas. Tage was armed with a main battery of eight 164 mm (6.5 in) guns and had a curved armor deck that was 51 to 56 mm (2 to 2.2 in) thick.

Tage spent the 1890s operating in the Mediterranean Sea, either as part of the active Mediterranean Squadron or in the Reserve Squadron, which was typically activated for annual training exercises with the rest of the fleet. The ship was modernized in 1900, which included the installation of new boilers, removal of her sailing rig, and other alterations. She operated with the Newfoundland and Iceland Naval Division and later the Atlantic Squadron in the early 1900s. Tage was ultimately struck from the naval register in 1910 and then broken up for scrap.

== Design ==
In 1878, the French Navy embarked on a program of cruiser construction authorized by the Conseil des Travaux (Council of Works) for a strategy aimed at attacking British merchant shipping in the event of war. The program called for ships of around 3,000 long tons (3,048 t) with a speed of 16 knots (30 km/h; 18 mph). The first four vessels of the program were wood-hulled unprotected cruisers, but a planned fifth vessel, originally intended along the same lines, was radically re-designed as the first modern protected cruiser of the French fleet, which became Sfax. In 1883, Bertin proposed a follow-on vessel based closely on Sfax, the principal change being an increase in the power of the ship's propulsion system to reach a speed of 18 knots (33 km/h; 21 mph), a major improvement over the 16 knots (30 km/h; 18 mph) reached by Sfax. The Conseil approved the specifications on 10 July, but Bertin continued to work on the design, particularly after the Navy requested the speed to be increased by another knot to keep pace with developments in fast civilian steam ships. After a meeting on 20 May 1884, the Conseil suggested removing the cellular layer of watertight compartments above the armor deck that Bertin had devised for Sfax as a way to save weight and thereby increase speed. Bertin submitted three variations in mid-1885, which the Conseil examined and rejected on 9 June.

At the same time, the naval architect Charles Jaÿ was preparing a proposal to meet the Navy's requirements, which he completed on 18 December 1884. His proposed ship would have a top speed of 19 to 20 knots (35 to 37 km/h; 22 to 23 mph), and he based the arrangement of the propulsion system on information received from the trials of the British cruiser Iris, which had reached 18.6 knots (34.4 km/h; 21.4 mph) during initial speed tests. Instead of Bertin's cellular layer, Jaÿ employed a cofferdam above the armor deck to control flooding in the event of battle damage. Vice Admiral Alexandre Peyron, then the Minister of the Navy, forwarded Jaÿ's design to the Conseil on 19 January 1885. After an evaluation on 24 February, the Conseil requested modifications, including an armament identical to Sfax and improved armor protection. Jaÿ completed the revisions on 15 April, which the Conseil approved on 26 May.

=== General characteristics and machinery ===
Tage was 124.1 m (407 ft) long overall, 119.94 m (393.5 ft) long at the waterline, and 118.8 m (390 ft) long between perpendiculars. She had a maximum beam of 16.38 m (53 ft 9 in) below the waterline and an average draft of 6.95 m (22 ft 10 in), which increased to 7.5 m (25 ft) aft. She displaced 7,073.65 t (6,961.93 long tons) as designed and up to 7,600 t (7,500 long tons) at full load. Her hull featured a pronounced ram bow and short fore and sterncastles. As was typical for French warships of the period, she had a pronounced tumblehome shape and an overhanging stern. Tage's hull was constructed primarily of steel, but her keel and sternpost were iron. Her superstructure was minimal, consisting primarily of a small conning tower forward. Her crew consisted of 511 officers and enlisted men, nearly half of whom—250 men—worked in the engine and boiler rooms.

Tage was propelled by a pair of horizontal, three-cylinder triple-expansion steam engines, each driving a four-bladed, bronze screw propeller. The engines consisted of two high-pressure cylinders and a low pressure cylinder, the latter of which could be disconnected to allow the machinery to be run as a two-cylinder compound engine. Steam was provided by twelve coal-burning fire-tube boilers that were ducted into funnels located amidships. The boilers were divided into three groups of four, each group in its own watertight boiler room. To supplement the steam engines on long voyages, she was originally fitted with a barque sailing rig with three masts.

The power plant was rated to produce 12,410 indicated horsepower (9,250 kW) for a top speed of 19 knots (35 km/h; 22 mph). On steam trials, she reached 17.8 knots (33.0 km/h; 20.5 mph) from 8,115 ihp (6,051 kW) using normal draft and 19.2 knots (35.6 km/h; 22.1 mph) from 12,110 ihp (9,030 kW) using forced draft. The engines were capable of reaching 97 revolutions per minute, but they vibrated excessively above 90 rpm, and so in 1893, they were modified to be limited to a maximum of 87 rpm to address the problem. Coal storage amounted to 856 t (842 long tons) normally and up to 1,023 t (1,007 long tons) at full load. Her cruising radius was 4,642 nautical miles (8,597 km; 5,342 mi) at an economical speed of 12 knots (22 km/h; 14 mph).

=== Armament and armor ===
The ship was initially armed with a main battery of six 164.7 mm (6.48 in) M1881 28-caliber (cal.) guns carried in individual pivot mounts. Four of the guns were mounted in sponsoned on the upper deck, two on each broadside, while the other two were placed in embrasures in the forecastle. These weapons were supported by a secondary battery of ten 138.6 mm (5.46 in) M1881 30 cal. guns that were carried in a main deck battery amidships. For close-range defense against torpedo boats, she carried three 47 mm (1.9 in) M1885 3-pounder Hotchkiss guns, a single 47 mm Hotchkiss revolver cannon, and fourteen 37 mm (1.5 in) 1-pounder Hotchkiss revolvers, all in individual mounts. She also carried seven 356 mm (14 in) torpedo tubes in her hull above the waterline. Two were in the bow, two were on each broadside, and the last was in the stern.

The ship was protected by a wrought iron armor deck that was 40 mm (1.6 in) on the flat portion, increasing to 80 mm (3.1 in) on the section that covered her propulsion machinery spaces and magazines. Toward the sides of the ship, the deck sloped down and increased in thickness slightly to 44 mm (1.7 in); the sloped sides terminated at the hull 1.30 m (4 ft 3 in) below the waterline. Both sections of the deck were layered over 14 mm (0.55 in) of hull plating. Tage's bow was reinforced above the deck by 30 mm (1.2 in) layered on the 14 mm of hull plating, but the bow was not otherwise strengthened for ramming attacks. The main deck battery had transverse bulkheads that were 80 mm on either end. Her conning tower also had 80 mm sides. Between the armor and main decks, a cofferdam was erected at sides of the ship, which was lined with cellulose to contain flooding in the event of damage.

=== Modifications ===
During the ship's initial trials in 1889, the navy decided to increase Tage's armament with an additional pair of 164.7 mm guns. Small sponsons were added amidships, but delays in the delivery of the gun mounts left the sponsons empty until 1892. At that time, the ship underwent a thorough refit that included replacing the original medium-caliber gun armament with newer quick-firing guns of the same size. These consisted of eight 164.7 mm M1884 30-cal. guns and eight 138.6 mm M1884 30-cal. guns. The sailing rig was removed, along with the mainmast, the remaining masts were shortened, and the mizzenmast was relocated further forward. It was during this refit that the engines were limited to 87 rpm to address the vibration problem. The work began in August 1892 and lasted into April 1893. In 1897, the bow and stern torpedo tubes were removed. A second major refit was carried out between 1899 and 1901, which included the installation of new boilers and revisions to the light guns. The original fire-tube boilers were replaced with Bellville type water-tube boilers. At that time, she carried a defensive battery of fourteen 47 mm M1885 QF guns and a pair of 37 mm (1.5 in) M1885 QF guns.

== Service history ==
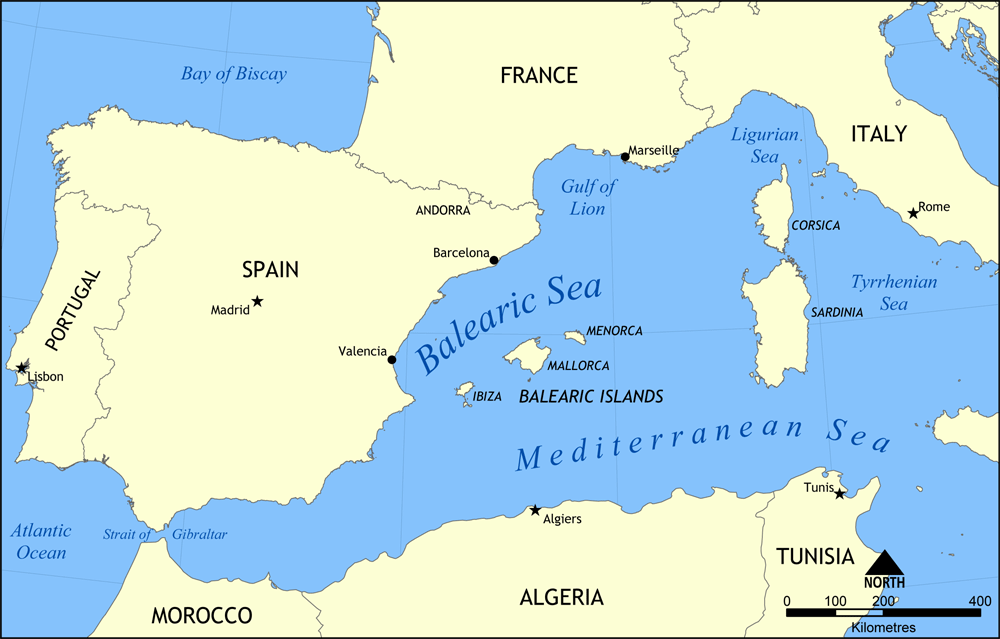
Map of the western Mediterranean, where Tage operated for most of her career

Tage was ordered on 3 August 1885 and was laid down later that month at the Ateliers et Chantiers de la Loire shipyard in Saint-Nazaire. She was launched on 28 October 1886 and began fitting out. Installation of her engines lasted from 11 July 1887 to 12 July 1888. She was towed to the Arsenal de Brest shortly before being commissioned for sea trials on 1 March 1889. These lasted until 20 October 1890, when the ship was placed in full commission. Three days later, she departed for Toulon, where she joined the Mediterranean Squadron. There she served as part of the reconnaissance force for the main French battle fleet, along with the cruisers Sfax, Amiral Cécille, and Lalande. The ship participated in the 1891 fleet maneuvers, which began on 23 June and concluded on 11 July. In August 1892, the ship was refitted at Toulon, and in April 1893, she returned to active service. By that time, Tage had been assigned to the Reserve Squadron, where she spent six months of the year on active service with full crews for maneuvers; the rest of the year was spent laid up with a reduced crew. At that time, the unit also included several older ironclads and the cruisers Davout, Sfax, Forbin, and Condor.

Tage took part in the fleet maneuvers in 1894; from 9 to 16 July, the ships involved took on supplies in Toulon for the maneuvers that began later on the 16th. A series of exercises included shooting practice, a blockade simulation, and scouting operations in the western Mediterranean. The maneuvers concluded on 3 August. Tage returned to the Mediterranean Squadron in 1895, joining the recently completed cruiser Suchet and the three Troude-class cruisers. She took part in the fleet maneuvers that year, which began on 1 July and concluded on the 27th. She was assigned to "Fleet A", which along with "Fleet B" represented the French fleet, and was tasked with defeating the hostile "Fleet C", which represented the Italian fleet.

The ship was still formally assigned to the Reserve Squadron in 1896, though she was out of service for repairs that year. That year, she was reduced to the 2nd category of reserve, along with several old coastal defense ships, ironclads, and other cruisers. They were retained in a state that allowed them to be mobilized in the event of a major war. In 1897, Tage was reactivated to participate in the second phase of the exercises of the Northern Squadron. These lasted from 18 to 21 July, and the scenario saw the Tage and Sfax simulate a hostile fleet steaming from the Mediterranean Sea to attack France's Atlantic coast. In the course of the exercises, the Northern Squadron successfully intercepted the cruisers and "defeated" them.

Tage was refitted again between September 1899 and April 1901 at Brest, France. After returning to service in 1901, she remained in Brest, though she was not attached to the Northern Squadron. In 1902, she was assigned to the Newfoundland and Iceland Naval Division, serving with the cruisers D'Estrées, Suchet, and Descartes. The unit was tasked with patrolling fishing areas off the coast of North America. She remained on the station the following year, and she was joined by the cruiser Lavoisier. Later in 1903, she was transferred to the Atlantic Squadron, which had previously been amalgamated with the Northern Squadron. At that time, the unit consisted of Tage, Troude, and D'Estrées. Later that year, Tage was relieved by the armored cruiser Dupleix; Tage thereafter returned to Brest, where she was paid off into the 2nd category of reserve on. On 20 October that year, she was transferred to the special reserve, and in 1904, she was sent to Landévennec, where she joined Sfax. The ship was struck from the naval register on 7 June 1907, but was kept at Brest through 1909 before being placed for sale on 3 December that year. She was eventually sold on 25 August 1910 to the Shipbreaking Co., based in London, and broken up.
