= Troude-class cruiser =

Protected cruiser class of the French Navy

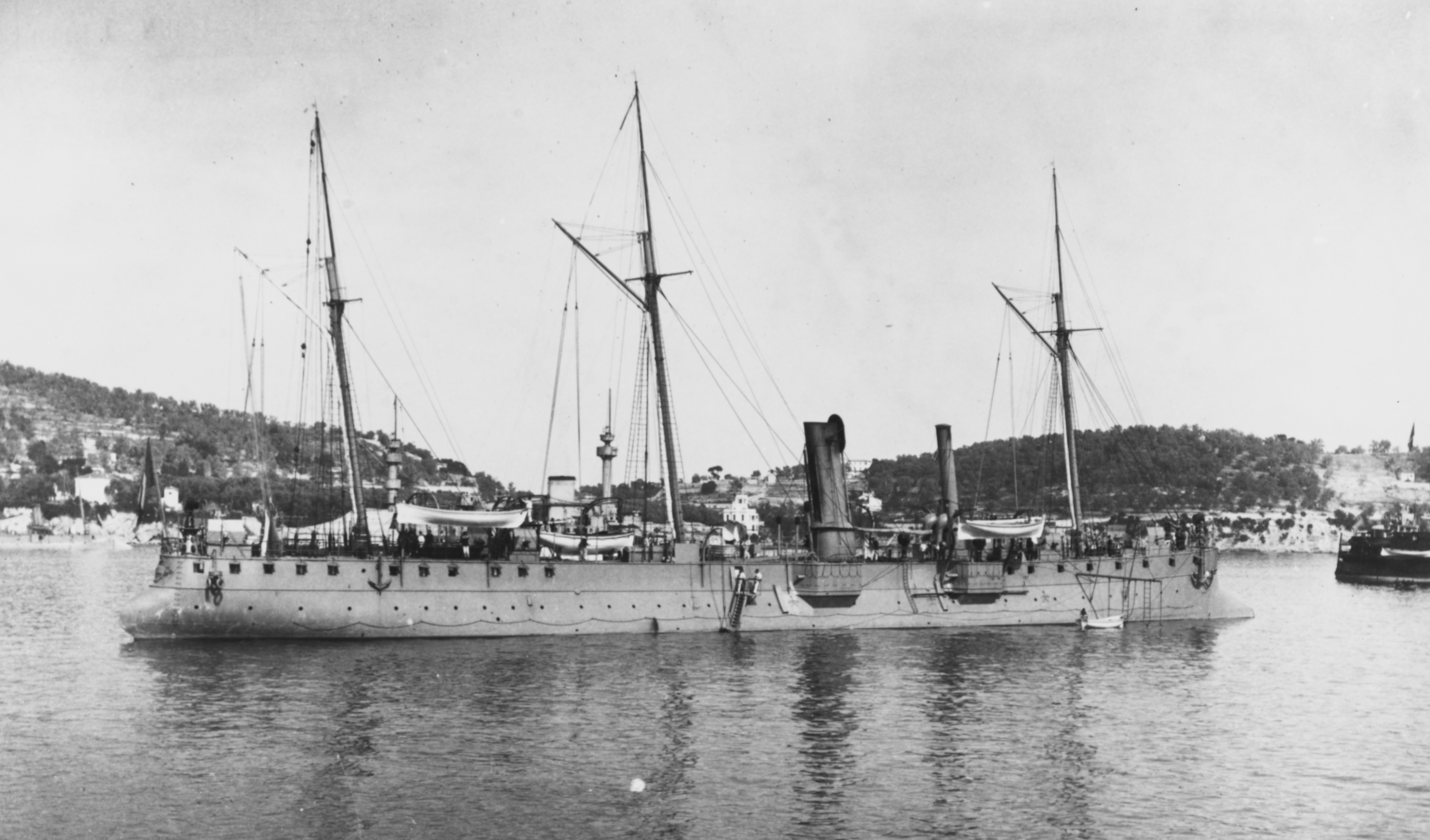
- Troude early in her career

Class overview
- Name: Troude class
- Builders: Forges et Chantiers de la Gironde
- Operators: French Navy
- Preceded by: Forbin class
- Succeeded by: Jean Bart class
- Built: 1886–1891
- In commission: 1891–1922
- Completed: 3
- Retired: 3

General characteristics
- Type: Protected cruiser
- Displacement: 1,877 t (1,847 long tons; 2,069 short tons)
- Length: 95 m (311 ft 8 in) (lwl)
- Beam: 9.5 m (31 ft 2 in)
- Draft: 4.27 m (14 ft)
- Installed power: 5 × fire-tube boilers; 6,300 ihp (4,700 kW)
- Propulsion: 2 × compound steam engines; 2 × screw propellers
- Speed: 20.5 knots (38.0 km/h; 23.6 mph)
- Range: 2,110 nmi (3,910 km; 2,430 mi) at 10 knots (19 km/h; 12 mph)
- Complement: 200
- Armament: 4 × 138.6 mm (5.46 in) guns; 4 × 47 mm (1.9 in) guns; 4 × 37 mm (1.5 in) Hotchkiss revolver cannon; 4 × 356 mm (14 in) torpedo tubes; 150 naval mines
- Armor: Deck: 40 mm (1.6 in); Conning tower: 40 mm

The Troude class was a group of three protected cruisers built for the French Navy in the late 1880s and early 1890s. The class, which was very similar to the preceding Forbin class, comprised Troude, Cosmao and Lalande. They were ordered as part of a fleet program that accorded with the theories of the Jeune École, which proposed a fleet based on cruisers and torpedo boats to defend France. The Troude-class cruisers were intended to serve as flotilla leaders for the torpedo boats, and they were armed with a main battery of four 138 mm (5.4 in) guns.

All three members of the class served in the Mediterranean Squadron in their early careers, where they took part in routine training exercises. In 1897, Troude became the flagship of the Levant Division and was later transferred to the North Atlantic Division in 1899. All three ships were in reserve by 1901. Troude was reactivated for a brief stint in the North Atlantic from 1904 to 1905, while Lalande returned to service in the Mediterranean in 1906. Troude was discarded in 1907 or 1908 and Lalande was broken up for scrap in 1912. Cosmao remained in reserve until the start of World War I in August 1914, when she was recommissioned to patrol the coast of French Morocco. She, too, was scrapped after the war in 1922.

== Design ==
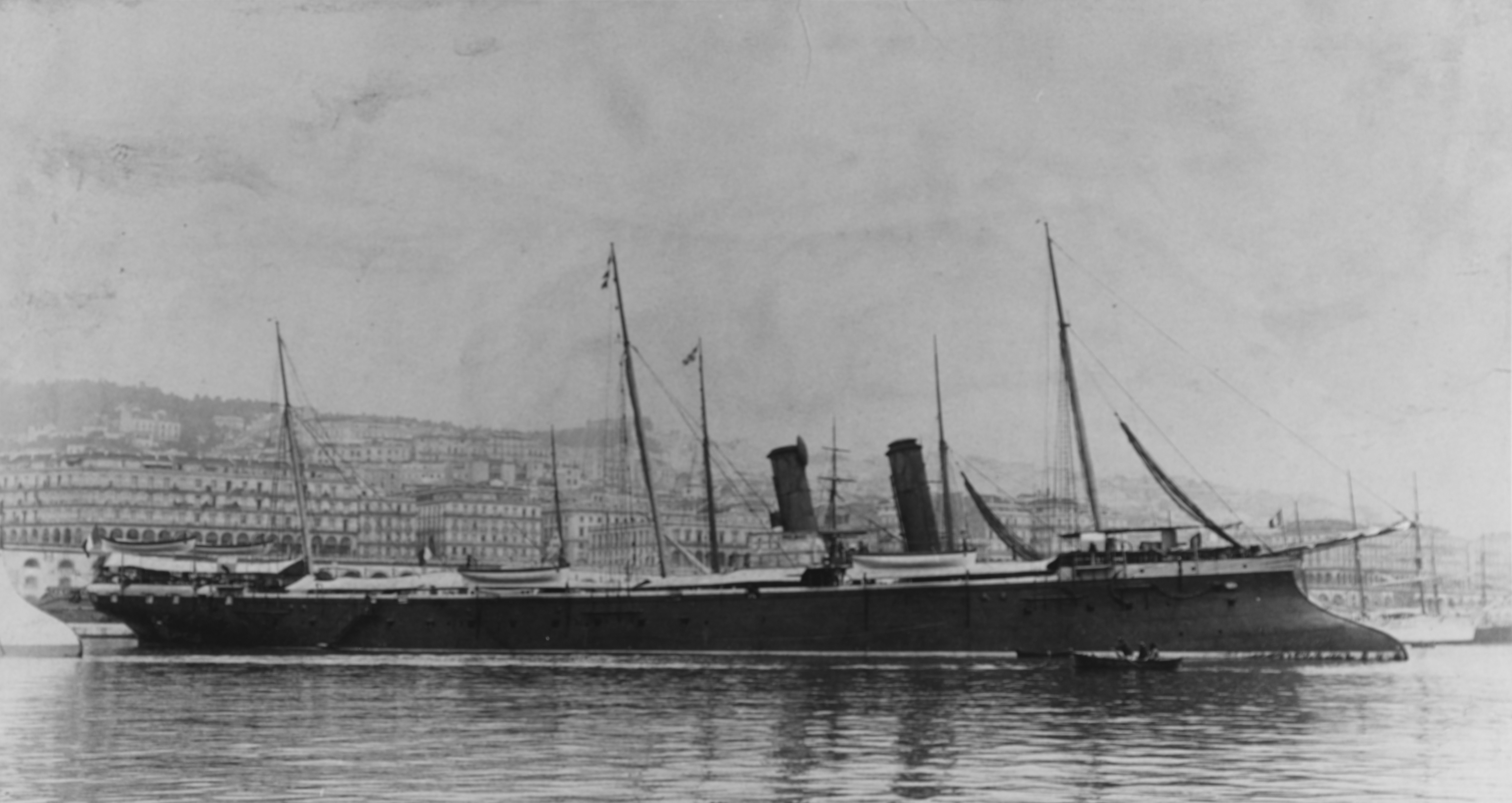
The unprotected cruiser Milan, the predecessor to the Troude class

By the late 1870s, the unprotected cruisers and avisos the French Navy had built as fleet scouts were becoming obsolescent, particularly as a result of their low speed of 12 to 14 knots (22 to 26 km/h; 14 to 16 mph), which rendered them too slow to be effective scouts. Beginning in 1879, the Conseil des Travaux (Council of Works) had requested designs for small but fast cruisers of about 2,000 long tons (2,032 t) displacement that could be used as scouts for the main battle fleet or to lead squadrons of torpedo boats. The naval engineer Louis-Émile Bertin had advocated for just such a vessel since 1875, and his design became the cruiser Milan. Bertin's design would eventually be developed into the Forbin-type of protected cruisers.

In the early 1880s, the Jeune École doctrine, which envisioned using a combination of cruisers and torpedo boats to defend France and attack enemy merchant shipping, became popular in French naval circles. In early 1886, the Jeune École supporter Gabriel Charmes published his book La réforme de la Marine (The Reform of the Navy), in which he called for small commerce raiding cruisers armed with a pair of 138.6 mm (5.46 in) guns—sufficient for the task of sinking merchant vessels—and a speed of 20 knots (37 km/h; 23 mph), which would allow them to escape any stronger vessel. Admiral Théophile Aube, an ardent supporter of the Jeune École, had become the Naval Minister at the same time. He requested on 1 February 1886 just such a vessel from Marie de Bussy, the Inspector General of Naval Engineering. The following day, de Bussy submitted a set of specifications to meet Aube's requirements; these included a speed of at least 19.5 knots (36.1 km/h; 22.4 mph), a range of 2,400 nautical miles (4,400 km; 2,800 mi) at a speed of 10 knots (19 km/h; 12 mph), two 138.6 mm guns, and a 40 mm (1.6 in) curved armor deck. Over the following month, de Bussy prepared a more detailed design based on these specifications, which Aube approved on 20 March. Three of the vessels were allocated to the 1887 budget, which included a number of other cruisers, all of which were part of Aube's program to equip the French fleet with a number of commerce raiders.

The first two vessels of the 1887 budget—Forbin and Surcouf—were built in government shipyards according to de Bussy's plans, but for the third vessel, he issued the requirements prepared in February to private shipyards for competing designs. Five yards responded by 30 April 1886, and the proposal from Jean Baron, the chief engineer at Forges et Chantiers de la Gironde, was selected; this vessel became Troude, the first member of the Troude class. By this time, an extraordinary budget was passed for 1887 that included three more small cruisers. One of these was ordered to de Bussy's design, while the other two became the Troude-class cruisers Lalande and Cosmao. As with the Forbin-class ships, the original armament of just two medium-caliber guns was deemed to be insufficient, and so they were modified during construction to receive an additional pair of guns.

=== General characteristics and machinery ===
Plan and profile drawing of the Troude class

The ships of the Troude class were 95 m (311 ft 8 in) long at the waterline and 95.89 m (314 ft 7 in) long overall, with a beam of 9.5 m (31 ft 2 in) and an average draft of 4.27 m (14 ft 0 in), which increased to 5.17 m (17 ft) aft. They displaced 1,877.5 t (1,847.8 long tons; 2,069.6 short tons) as designed. Their hulls had a pronounced ram bow and tumblehome shape that characterized most French warships of the period. They had a minimal superstructure that consisted primarily of a small bridge. Their crew amounted to 200 officers and enlisted men.

The ships' propulsion systems were manufactured by Schneider-Creusot and consisted of a pair of horizontal compound steam engines driving two 3-bladed, bronze screw propellers. Steam was provided by five coal-burning fire-tube boilers that were ducted into two closely placed funnels. The forward funnel was thin and the aft wider, though both were raked backward slightly. Their machinery was rated to produce 6,300 indicated horsepower (4,700 kW) for a top speed of 20.5 knots (38.0 km/h; 23.6 mph), but all three ships exceeded these figures on their initial speed tests, reaching between 6,384 and 6,560 ihp (4,761 and 4,892 kW) for speeds of 20.6 to 20.89 knots (38.15 to 38.69 km/h; 23.71 to 24.04 mph), Cosmao being the fastest of the three. The ships vibrated excessively at speeds in excess of 20 knots, however, and the hull and engines were reportedly unable to withstand prolonged steaming at top speed as a result. This was a result of the lightly-built hull and insufficiently strong scantlings, and was common to ships of the type. Coal storage amounted to 270 t (270 long tons; 300 short tons) normally and up to 300 t (300 long tons; 330 short tons) at full load. When steaming at a speed of 17 knots (31 km/h; 20 mph), the ships had a cruising range of 1,621 nautical miles (3,002 km; 1,865 mi); their cruising radius grew to 2,110 nmi (3,910 km; 2,430 mi) at a more economical pace of 10 knots (19 km/h; 12 mph).

=== Armament and armor ===
The ships were armed with a main battery of four 138.6 mm (5.46 in) M1881/84 30-caliber guns in individual pivot mounts, all in sponsons located amidships with two guns per broadside. They were supplied with a variety of shells, including solid cast iron projectiles and explosive armor-piercing shells, both of which weighed 30 kg (66 lb). The guns fired with a muzzle velocity of 590 m/s (1,900 ft/s). For close-range defense against torpedo boats, they carried four 47 mm (1.9 in) M1885 3-pounder Hotchkiss guns and four 37 mm (1.5 in) M1885 1-pounder Hotchkiss revolver cannon. They were also armed with four 350 mm (14 in) torpedo tubes in their hull below the waterline, and they had provisions to carry up to 150 naval mines.

Armor protection consisted of a curved armor deck that was 40 mm (1.6 in) thick. The deck was wrought iron that sloped down at the sides to provide a measure of vertical protection. Above the deck, cofferdam was added to control flooding in the event of battle damage. Below the deck and above the engine and boiler rooms was a 7 mm (0.28 in) anti-splinter deck to protect the machinery from shell fragments. All of the guns were initially fitted with gun shields. During construction, Troude and Cosmao were modified with an armored conning tower with 40 mm sides, though Lalande did not receive this alteration.

=== Modifications ===
The ships of the class underwent a series of modifications over their careers. In 1893–1894, Troude and Lalande had their cofferdams replaced by a layer of highly sub-divided watertight compartments that covered the entire width of the deck. A number of other changes were also carried out, including reinforcing the sponsons for the main battery guns, altering the sailing rig, and converting the main battery to quick-firing guns (QF). Cosmao was similarly modified in 1894–1895. Troude and Cosmao received converted M1881/84 pattern guns, while Lalande had new M1884 pattern guns installed. The navy ordered the forward torpedo tubes be removed in November 1895. The ships had their sailing rig reduced in 1902. The armament for all three ships was revised again in the early 1900s, and by 1904 it consisted of the four main battery guns and a standardized anti-torpedo boat armament of nine 47 mm guns. Each ship carried a pair of 37 mm QF guns to be fitted to their boats. The remaining two torpedo tubes were also removed.

In December 1916, Cosmao—the only member of the class still in service by that time—was disarmed temporarily, before being re-armed in March 1917 with a pair of 100 mm (3.9 in) guns taken from the cruiser Descartes and four 90 mm (3.5 in) M1877 guns. The following year, one of the 100 mm guns and two of the 90 mm guns were removed to be installed on other vessels.

== Construction ==
Construction data
Name	Shipyard	Laid down	Launched	Commissioned (Note: The date the ships were placed in full commission.)
Troude	Forges et Chantiers de la Gironde, Lormont	27 August 1886	22 October 1888	5 February 1891
Lalande	Forges et Chantiers de la Gironde, Lormont	6 May 1887	22 March 1889	25 April 1891
Cosmao	Forges et Chantiers de la Gironde, Lormont	1887	29 August 1889	8 August 1891

== Service history ==
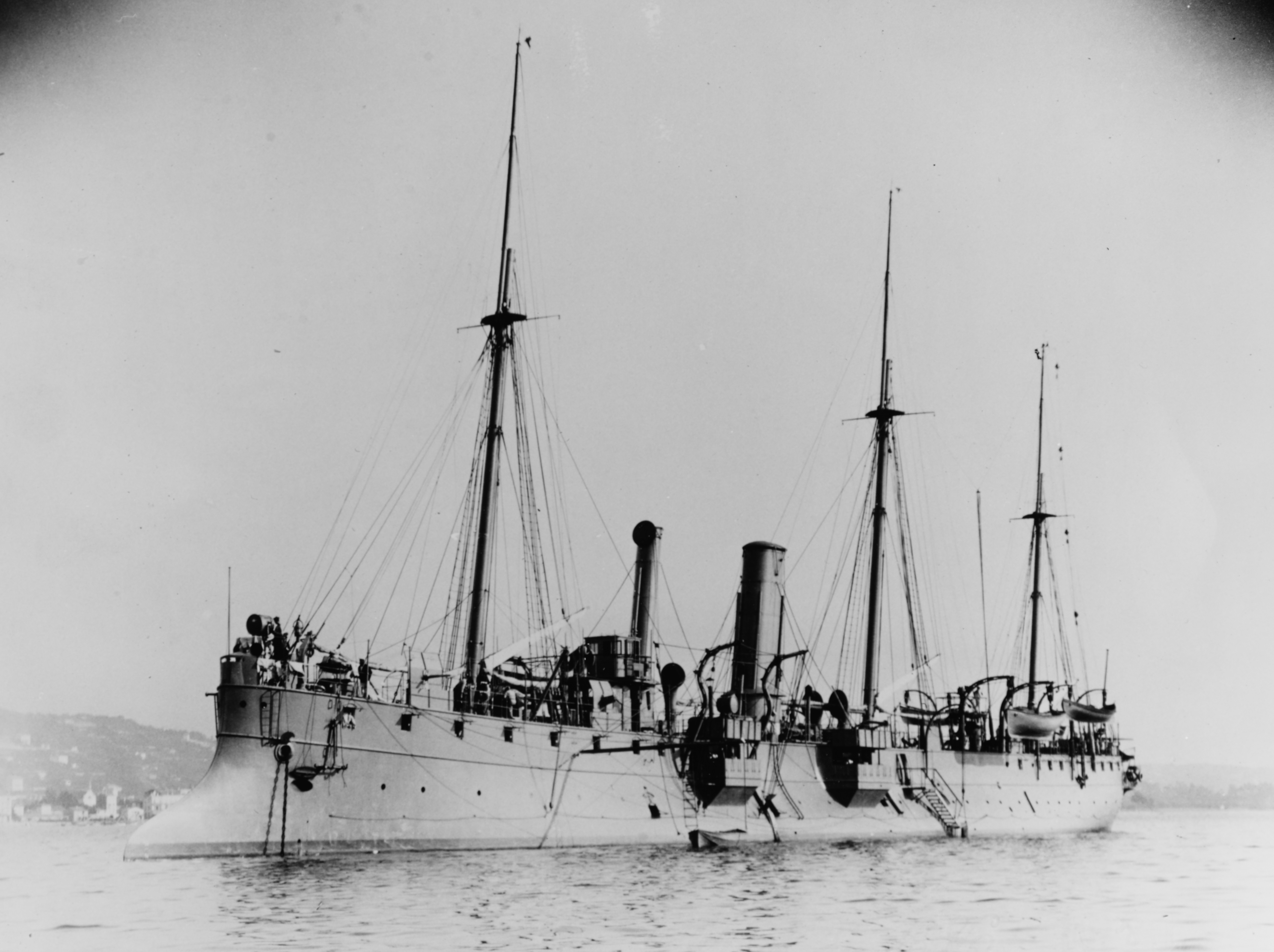
Lalande in the early 1890s

All three members of the class spent their early careers in the Mediterranean Squadron. During this period, the ships were primarily occupied with peacetime training exercises. In 1897, Troude was transferred to the Levant Division, becoming its flagship. She served there during the early stages of the Cretan Revolt of 1897–1898. She was moved again to the North Atlantic Division in 1899. All three ships were reduced to reserve by 1901.

Troude returned to the North Atlantic Division in 1904, and remained there through 1905. Lalande was reactivated in 1906 for service in the Mediterranean Squadron, while Cosmao remained out of service. Troude was struck from the naval register in either 1907, or 1908, and was broken up for scrap that year. Lalande remained in service in the Mediterranean through 1908. Struck from the naval register in 1911, she was sold to ship breakers the following year. Cosmao was recommissioned in August 1914 after the start of World War I and tasked with patrolling the Moroccan coast, though she saw no action. She was struck in 1919, used as a hulk from 1920 to 1927, and was eventually sold to ship breakers in 1928.
