= Théophile Aube =

French admiral

Hyacinthe Laurent Théophile Aube
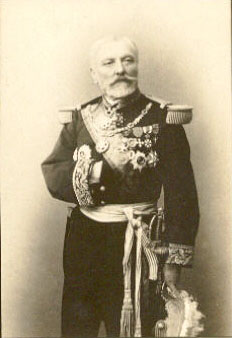
- Born: 22 November 1826; Toulon, Var, France
- Died: 31 December 1890 (aged 64) Toulon
- Allegiance: France
- Branch: Navy
- Service years: 1855-1890
- Rank: Vice Admiral
- Other work: French Minister of Marine

Hyacinthe Laurent Théophile Aube (French pronunciation: [teɔfil ob]) (22 November 1826, Toulon, Var – 31 December 1890, Toulon) was a French admiral, who held several important governmental positions during the Third Republic.

Aube served as Governor of Martinique between 1879 and 1881, and as the French Minister of Marine from January 7, 1886, to May 30, 1887. He was an ardent supporter of the Jeune École and he temporarily stopped construction work on several battleships during his time in office.
