= Conseil des travaux =

The Conseil des travaux (Board of Construction) was formed in 1831 in the Ministry of the Navy to examine projects relating to warship construction and dockyard infrastructure. It was composed of at least 18 members throughout its existence and included senior representatives from the corps of engineers, artillery branch, and inspectors of hydraulic works.

Among its tasks was evaluating projects, plans and cost estimates for warships, preparing the instructions for building new ships, preparing the documentation for competitive proposals and tenders and evaluating new inventions submitted to the ministry. More specifically, the council considered the staff requirements submitted by the Conseil supérieur de la Marine (Superior Naval Council) to the Minister and submitted its comments to him. He would then request design studies from the Directeur du matérial (Director of Equipment), who might invite competitive submissions, which would then be evaluated by the council. Approved designs would be returned to the Minister for his consideration and preliminary design work would begin by the Constructions navales (Naval Construction Department), supervised by the Directeur du matérial.

By the 1890s the council was controlled by very traditional admirals that often clashed with more innovative ministers. It was disbanded in 1905 and its functions turned over to the new Comité technique (Technical Committee).

== Bibliography ==
- Jordan, John & Caresse, Philippe (2017). French Battleships of World War One. Annapolis, Maryland: Naval Institute Press. ISBN 978-1-59114-639-1.
