= French cruiser Linois =

At least two ships of the French Navy have borne the name Linois:

- French cruiser Linois (1867), an unprotected cruiser launched in 1867 and stricken in 1891
- French cruiser Linois (1894), a Linois-class cruiser launched in 1894 and stricken in 1910
