= French cruiser Du Chayla =

Protected cruiser of the French Navy

- Du Chayla's sister ship D'Assas

History

France
- Name: Du Chayla
- Ordered: 18 March 1893
- Builder: Arsenal de Cherbourg
- Laid down: 23 March 1894
- Launched: 10 November 1895
- Commissioned: 15 July 1897
- Decommissioned: 28 July 1921
- Stricken: 27 October 1921
- Fate: Broken up, 1933

General characteristics
- Class & type: D'Assas-class cruiser
- Displacement: 3,957.1 t (3,894.6 long tons; 4,362.0 short tons)
- Length: 99.65 m (326 ft 11 in) loa
- Beam: 13.68 m (44 ft 11 in)
- Draft: 5.8 m (19 ft 0 in)
- Installed power: 20 × water-tube boilers; 10,000 ihp (7,500 kW)
- Propulsion: 2 × triple-expansion steam engines; 2 × screw propellers
- Speed: 20 knots (37 km/h; 23 mph)
- Range: 6,000 nmi (11,000 km; 6,900 mi) at 10 knots (19 km/h; 12 mph)
- Complement: 370–392
- Armament: 6 × 164.7 mm (6.5 in) guns; 4 × 100 mm (3.9 in) guns; 10 × 47 mm (1.9 in) guns; 2 × 37 mm (1.5 in) guns; 3 × 37 mm Hotchkiss revolver cannon; 2 × 356 mm (14 in) torpedo tubes
- Armor: Deck: 30 to 80 mm (1.2 to 3.1 in); Conning tower: 60 mm (2.4 in); Gun shields: 54 mm (2.1 in)

Du Chayla was a protected cruiser built for the French Navy in the 1890s; she was a member of the D'Assas class. The D'Assas-class cruisers were ordered as part of a construction program directed at strengthening the fleet's cruiser force at a time the country was concerned with the growing naval threat of the Italian and German fleets. The new cruisers were intended to serve with the main fleet and overseas in the French colonial empire. Du Chayla was armed with a main battery of six 164 mm (6.5 in) guns, was protected by an armor deck that was 70 to 80 mm (2.8 to 3.1 in) thick, and was capable of steaming at a top speed of 20 knots (37 km/h; 23 mph).

Du Chayla entered service in 1899, joining the Mediterranean Squadron, where she served for the next eight years. During this period, she was occupied primarily with routine training exercises. In August 1907, she supported an amphibious assault in French Morocco during the Bombardment of Casablanca. During World War I, she patrolled the Atlantic for German commerce raiders but saw no action. By 1918, she had been partially disarmed to supply weapons to the French Army. Du Chayla took part in the Allied intervention in the Russian Civil War in 1919 but was recalled to France in 1920, where she was struck from the naval register in 1921 and sold to ship breakers.

== Design ==
In response to a war scare with Italy in the late 1880s, the French Navy embarked on a major construction program in 1890 to counter the threat of the Italian fleet and that of Italy's ally Germany. The plan called for a total of seventy cruisers for use in home waters and overseas in the French colonial empire. The D'Assas class, which also included D'Assas and Cassard, was ordered as part of the program. Their design was heavily drawn from that of the preceding Friant-class cruisers, being slightly longer and wider, which improved speed and stability.

Du Chayla was 99.65 m (326 ft 11 in) long overall, with a beam of 13.68 m (44 ft 11 in) and an average draft of 5.8 m (19 ft 0 in). She displaced 3,957.1 t (3,894.6 long tons; 4,362.0 short tons) as designed. Her crew varied over the course of her career, and consisted of 370–392 officers and enlisted men. The ship's propulsion system consisted of a pair of triple-expansion steam engines driving two screw propellers. Steam was provided by twenty coal-burning Lagrafel d'Allest water-tube boilers that were ducted into three funnels. Her machinery was rated to produce 10,000 indicated horsepower (7,500 kW) for a top speed of 20 knots (37 km/h; 23 mph). She had a cruising radius of 6,000 nautical miles (11,000 km; 6,900 mi) at 10 knots (19 km/h; 12 mph) and 1,000 nmi (1,900 km; 1,200 mi) at 20 knots.

The ship was armed with a main battery of six 164.7 mm (6.5 in) guns. They were placed in individual pivot mounts; one was on the forecastle, two were in sponsons abreast the forward conning tower, and the last was on the stern. These were supported by a secondary battery of four 100 mm (3.9 in) guns, which were carried in pivot mounts in the fore and aft conning towers, one on each side per tower. For close-range defense against torpedo boats, she carried ten 47 mm (1.9 in) 3-pounder Hotchkiss guns, two 37 mm (1.5 in) 1-pounder guns, and three 37 mm Hotchkiss revolver cannon. She was also armed with two 356 mm (14 in) torpedo tubes in her hull above the waterline. Armor protection consisted of a curved armor deck that was 30 to 80 mm (1.2 to 3.1 in) thick, along with 60 mm (2.4 in) plating on the conning tower. The main and secondary guns were fitted with 54 mm (2.1 in) thick gun shields.

=== Modifications ===
Du Chayla's 37 mm revolving cannon were removed in 1902, and her torpedo tubes were removed in 1908. She sent her 100 mm guns ashore in 1917 to strengthen the defenses of Port Said at the northern end of the Suez Canal. By 1918, most of her armament was removed, leaving her equipped with two 164.7 mm guns (one at the bow and the other at the stern), four 75 mm (3 in) M1897 guns in her sponsons, and four 47 mm guns.

== Service history ==
=== Construction – 1902 ===
Du Chayla was built by the Arsenal de Cherbourg shipyard; the shipyard received the contract for the ship on 18 March 1893. Her keel was laid down on 23 March 1894, and she was launched on 10 November 1895. The ship was commissioned on 15 July 1897 to begin sea trials, which were completed by 19 February 1898, when she was placed in full commission for active service. During her trials, she reached a top speed of 20.2 knots (37.4 km/h; 23.2 mph) using forced draft. The examinations revealed stability issues that necessitated the installation of bilge keels. After entering active service, she departed Cherbourg on 20 February for Toulon on the French Mediterranean coast, which she reached on 27 February. There, she joined the Escadre de la Méditerranée (Mediterranean Squadron), France's primary battle fleet. She remained in the unit the following year; at that time, the squadron consisted of six pre-dreadnought battleships, three armored cruisers, seven other protected cruisers, and several smaller vessels.

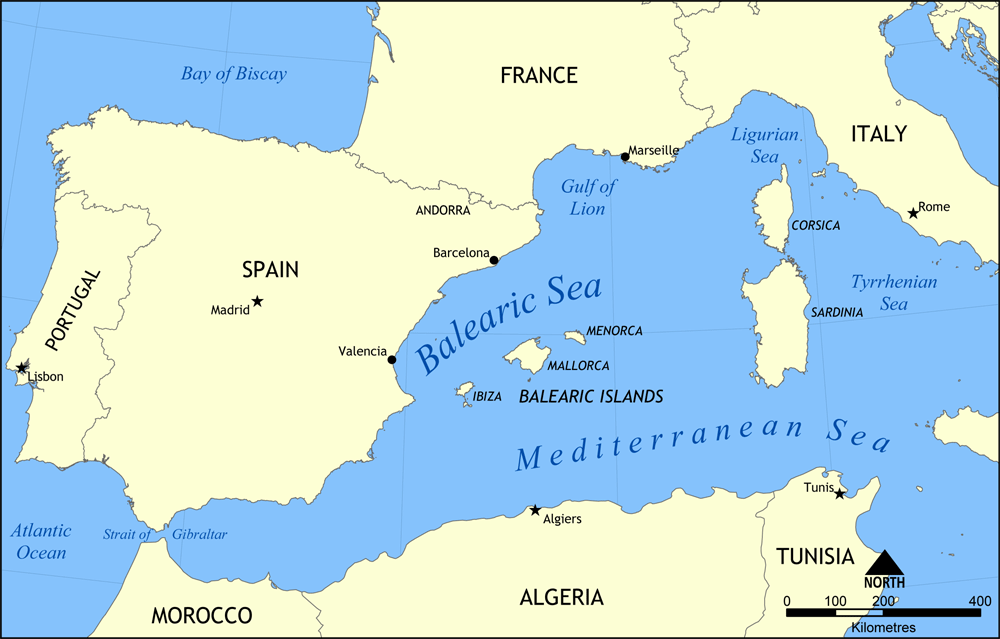
Map of the western Mediterranean, where Du Chayla operated for much of her career

Du Chayla operated with the Mediterranean Squadron in 1900, which was stationed in Toulon. On 6 March, Du Chayla joined several pre-dreadnought battleships and the cruisers Cassard, Lavoisier, and Galilée for maneuvers off Golfe-Juan on the Côte d'Azur, including night firing training. Over the course of April, the ships visited numerous French ports along the Mediterranean coast, and on 31 May the fleet steamed to Corsica for a visit that lasted until 8 June. She then took part in the fleet maneuvers that began later that month as part of Group II, along with Cassard and Galilée. The maneuvers included a blockade conducted by Group II in late June, and after completing its own exercises, the Mediterranean Squadron rendezvoused with the Northern Squadron off Lisbon, Portugal, in late June before proceeding to Quiberon Bay for joint maneuvers in July. The maneuvers concluded with a naval review in Cherbourg on 19 July for President Émile Loubet. On 1 August, the Mediterranean Fleet departed for Toulon, arriving on 14 August.

She remained with the Mediterranean Squadron the following year. That year, the annual fleet maneuvers were conducted from 3 to 28 July. During the exercises, the Northern Squadron steamed south for joint maneuvers with the Mediterranean Squadron. The Northern Squadron ships formed part of the hostile force, and as it was entering the Mediterranean from the Atlantic, represented a German squadron attempting to meet its Italian allies. The ship continued to serve in the squadron through 1902. During the 1902 fleet maneuvers, which began on 7 July, the Northern Squadron attempted to force a passage through the Strait of Gibraltar. The cruisers of the Mediterranean Squadron, including Du Chayla, conducted patrols from their base at Mers El Kébir to observe their entrance and signal the rest of the fleet. After successfully detecting the simulated enemy squadron, they shadowed the vessels until the rest of the Mediterranean Squadron assembled, but the Northern Squadron commander was able to shake his pursuers long enough to prevent them from intercepting his force before the end of the exercises on 15 July. Further maneuvers with the combined fleet took place, concluding on 5 August.

=== 1903–1933 ===
The ship remained in service with the squadron in 1903. Du Chayla was once again assigned to the Mediterranean Squadron in 1904. She remained in service with the unit in 1905, and in late March, she and the cruiser Linois were present in Tangier during a visit by the German armored cruiser Friedrich Carl and the passenger steamer SS Hamburg, which had the German Kaiser Wilhelm II aboard. The visit precipitated the First Moroccan Crisis between France and Germany. She was still assigned to the Mediterranean Squadron the following year. She was present for a naval review in Marseille on 16 September with elements of the Mediterranean Squadron. She took part in the fleet maneuvers that year, which began on 6 July with the concentration of the Northern and Mediterranean Squadrons in Algiers. The maneuvers were conducted in the western Mediterranean, alternating between ports in French North Africa and Toulon and Marseille, France, and concluding on 4 August. She remained in the Mediterranean Squadron in 1907, by which time the cruiser strength had been reduced to three armored cruisers and the protected cruiser Lalande.

Du Chayla was present for the 1907 fleet maneuvers, which again saw the Northern and Mediterranean Squadrons unite for large-scale operations held off the coast of French Morocco and in the western Mediterranean. The exercises consisted of three phases and began on 2 July and concluded on 30 July. In early August, the ship supported the landing of French soldiers at Casablanca in French Morocco. Rebels in French Morocco had seized control of the city and murdered several Europeans, which led to a request for support. Galilée was sent to put a landing party ashore, and she sent a force of 75 men into the city on 5 August. While the men were fighting their way to the French consulate, Galilée was joined by Du Chayla, and the two cruisers then bombarded the port and the fortress in the city, killing around 200. Additional French forces arrived by 9 August and sent a larger force of 3,000 sailors ashore. The rebels made a major assault on the French forces the next day, but intense fire support from the French warships drove them off with heavy losses. She remained on station in Morocco in 1908, nominally part of the Mediterranean Squadron. She was still assigned to the Morocco Division in 1911, by which time she had been joined by the protected cruiser Cosmao.

During World War I, Du Chayla operated in the Atlantic Ocean on patrol for German commerce raiders from the start of the war in July 1914 to 1916. That year, she was transferred to the Red Sea, where she spent the next two years. In May 1917, she was sent to the Indian Ocean, and in August, she sent some of her guns ashore at Port Said to strengthen the harbor defenses there. In April 1918, she sailed to Bizerte in French Tunisia, where she sent her four amidships 164.7 mm guns ashore. In late 1918, she was reassigned to the Levant Squadron. Immediately after the war in late 1918, she joined the French fleet that entered the Black Sea to intervene in the Russian Civil War, though she remained there only into the following year, when she was recalled to France. When she left Sevastopol, Russia, on 28 April 1919, she took the cruiser Almaz under tow to Constantinople in the Ottoman Empire, where she left her two days later. Du Chayla later returned to Cherbourg, where she was decommissioned on 28 July 1921 and struck from the naval register on 27 October. The ship was then towed to Brest in 1922, where she was used as a stationary training ship for engine room officers. By December 1925, Du Chayla had been replaced in that role by the old aviso Vauquois, and she was taken to Lorient, where she was employed as a landing hulk for the oil depot in the port. The ship was eventually placed for sale on 29 March 1933, being purchased on 15 November by a ship-breaking firm based in Saint-Nazaire; she was towed there in December and scrapped.
