= French cruiser Lavoisier =

Protected cruiser of the French Navy

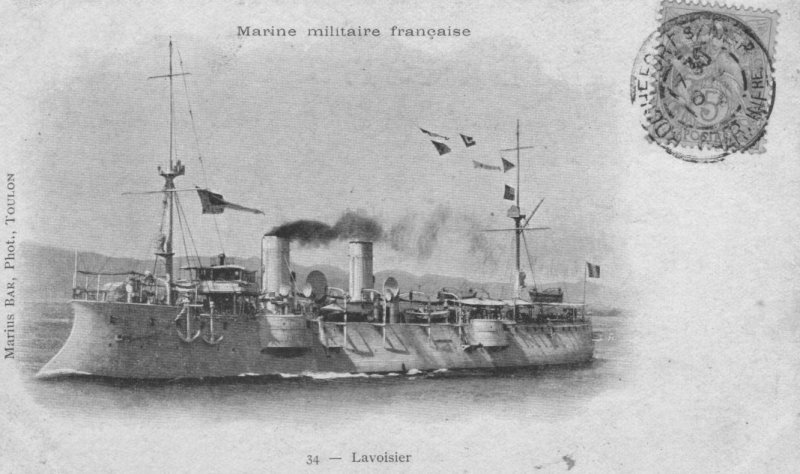
- Lavoisier underway

History

France
- Name: Lavoisier
- Namesake: Antoine Lavoisier
- Builder: Arsenal de Rochefort
- Laid down: January 1895
- Launched: 17 April 1897
- Completed: April 1898
- Decommissioned: August 1919
- Stricken: 1920
- Fate: Broken up

General characteristics
- Class & type: Linois-class cruiser
- Displacement: 2,285 to 2,318 long tons (2,322 to 2,355 t)
- Length: 100.63 m (330 ft 2 in) loa
- Beam: 10.62 m (34 ft 10 in)
- Draft: 5.44 m (17 ft 10 in)
- Installed power: 16 × water-tube boilers; 6,800 indicated horsepower (5,100 kW)
- Propulsion: 2 × triple-expansion steam engines; 2 × screw propellers
- Speed: 20.5 knots (38.0 km/h; 23.6 mph)
- Range: 3,000 nautical miles (5,600 km; 3,500 mi) at 10 knots (19 km/h; 12 mph)
- Complement: 250–269
- Armament: 4 × 138.6 mm (5.5 in) guns; 2 × 100 mm (3.9 in) guns; 8 × 47 mm (1.9 in) guns; 2 × 37 mm (1.5 in) guns; 4 × 37 mm Hotchkiss revolver cannon; 4 × 450 mm (17.7 in) torpedo tubes
- Armor: Deck: 40 mm (1.6 in); Conning tower: 138 mm (5 in)

Lavoisier was a protected cruiser of the French Navy built in the 1890s, the third and final member of the Linois class. Ordered as part of a large construction program aimed at countering the fleets of France's rivals, the Linois class was intended for use with France's fleets in home waters and in the French colonial empire. Lavoisier was armed with a main battery of four 138.6 mm (5.5 in) guns, was protected by an armor deck that was 40 mm (1.6 in) thick and she had a top speed of 20.5 knots (38.0 km/h; 23.6 mph).

The ship spent the first few years of her career operating with the French Mediterranean Squadron, where she conducted training exercises. In 1903, she began a decade of service with the Newfoundland and Iceland Naval Division, where she typically patrolled the fishing grounds from April to September before returning to France, where she would be decommissioned for the winter. These deployments sometimes included visits to Norway, and in some years, after returning to France in September, Lavoisier would be transferred to the Moroccan Naval Division until the next fishing season necessitated her return to the North Atlantic.

Lavoisier was attached to the 2nd Light Squadron in the English Channel at the start of World War I in August 1914, but she saw no action there. She was transferred to the eastern Mediterranean in December 1915, operated briefly with the main French fleet, and then conducted anti-submarine patrols in the western Mediterranean. In 1917, she returned to the Moroccan Naval Division, and the following year, she was reassigned to the Syrian Naval Division, where she remained through the end of the war. In April 1919, Lavoisier was detached from the Syrian Division; decommissioned for the last time in August, she was struck from the Navy Directory in early 1920 and sold to ship breakers.

== Design ==
Plan and profile drawing of the Linois class

In response to a war scare with Italy in the late 1880s, the French Navy embarked on a major construction program in 1890 to counter the threat of the Italian fleet and that of Italy's ally Germany. The plan called for a total of seventy cruisers for use in home waters and overseas in the French colonial empire. The Linois class was ordered as part of the program, and the design was based on the earlier Forbin class.

Lavoisier was 100.63 m (330 ft 2 in) long overall, with a beam of 10.62 m (34 ft 10 in) and a draft of 5.44 m (17 ft 10 in). She displaced 2,285 to 2,318 long tons (2,322 to 2,355 t). Her crew varied over the course of her career, amounting to 250–269 officers and enlisted men. The ship's propulsion system consisted of a pair of triple-expansion steam engines driving two screw propellers. Steam was provided by sixteen coal-burning Belleville type water-tube boilers that were ducted into two funnels. Her machinery was rated to produce 6,800 indicated horsepower (5,100 kW) for a top speed of 20.5 knots (38.0 km/h; 23.6 mph). Her cruising range was 3,000 nautical miles (5,600 km; 3,500 mi) at a speed of 10 knots (19 km/h; 12 mph); at full speed, her range fell to 600 nmi (1,100 km; 690 mi).

The ship was armed with a main battery of four 138.6 mm (5.5 in) 45-caliber guns in individual pivot mounts, all in sponsons located amidships with two guns per broadside. These were supported by a secondary battery that consisted of a pair of 100 mm (3.9 in) guns, one at the bow and the other at the stern. For close-range defense against torpedo boats, she carried eight 47 mm (1.9 in) 3-pounder Hotchkiss guns, two 37 mm (1.5 in) guns, and four 37 mm Hotchkiss revolver cannon. She was also armed with four 450 mm (17.7 in) torpedo tubes in her hull above the waterline. Armor protection consisted of a curved armor deck that was 40 mm (1.6 in) thick, along with 138 mm (5 in) plating on the conning tower.

== Service history ==
=== Construction – 1902 ===
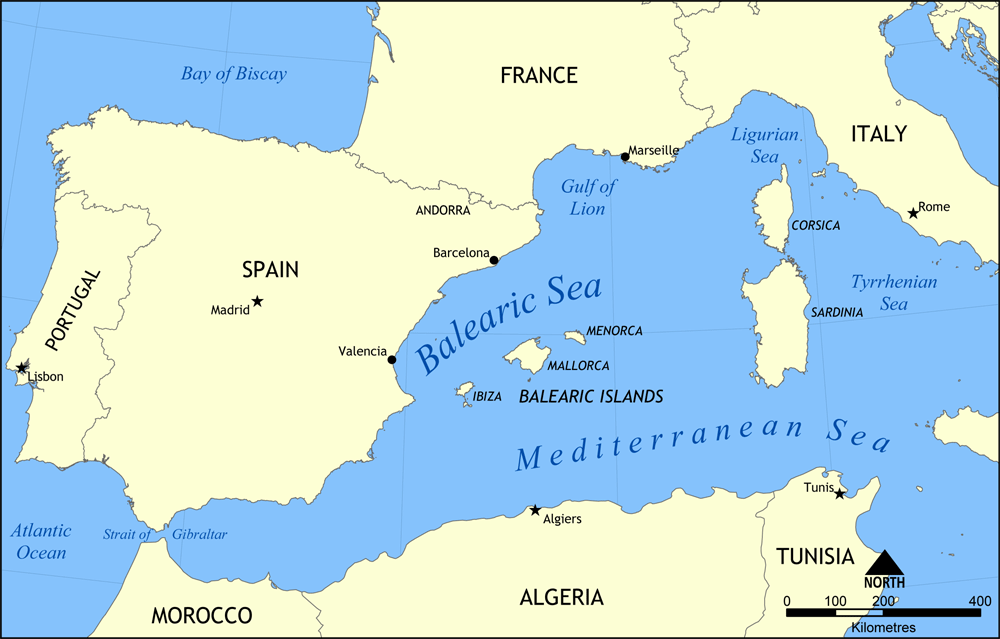
Map of the western Mediterranean, where Lavoisier operated during this period

Work on Lavoisier began with her keel laying at the Arsenal de Rochefort shipyard in Rochefort in January 1895. She was launched on 17 April 1897, was commissioned for sea trials on 1 December, and was completed in April 1898. On 19 April, the ship received orders to join the Mediterranean Squadron, France's primary battle fleet, and take the place of the cruiser Cosmao. She got underway with a partial crew on 28 April and arrived in Toulon on 3 May; there, she received her full complement by taking men from Cosmao. She participated in the fleet maneuvers that year, which lasted from 5 to 25 July. On 18 November, she conducted speed comparison tests with her sister ship Galilée. Lavoisier remained in the unit in 1899, which passed uneventfully, apart from having been sent to represent France at a sail regatta at Monaco on 13 March.

Lavoisier continued to operate with the Mediterranean Squadron in 1900. On 25 January, two of her crew were lost when one of her launches capsized in bad weather off La Seyne-sur-Mer. On 6 March, Lavoisier joined several pre-dreadnought battleships and the cruisers Du Chayla, Cassard, and Galilée for maneuvers off Golfe-Juan on the Côte d'Azur, including night firing training. Over the course of April, the ships visited numerous French ports along the Mediterranean coast, and on 31 May the fleet steamed to Corsica for a visit that lasted until 8 June. She then took part in the fleet maneuvers that began later that month as part of Group III. And after completing its own exercises in June, the Mediterranean Squadron rendezvoused with the Northern Squadron off Lisbon, Portugal at the end of the month before proceeding to Quiberon Bay for joint maneuvers in July. The maneuvers concluded with a naval review in Cherbourg on 19 July for President Émile Loubet. On 1 August, the Mediterranean Fleet departed for Toulon, arriving on 14 August. On 1 October, Lavoisier was decommissioned and designated as "fleet relief", being placed in 2nd category reserve.

The ship was recommissioned on 1 February 1901, taking crewmen from the armored cruiser Latouche-Tréville. Lavoisier rejoined the Mediterranean Fleet six days later at Golfe-Juan. On 24 March, she collided with the British merchant vessel Puritan, and though Lavoisier was not determined to be at fault in the accident, the French Navy agreed to pay for repairs. Lavoisier was scheduled to receive bilge keels to correct her tendency to roll excessively, but the work was postponed to allow her to conduct exercises with the rest of the fleet in July. She was again reduced to 2nd category reserve on 1 August and was dry docked on 25 October to have the bilge keels installed. She remained out of service through 1902 and was placed in ordinary reserve on 26 April.

=== 1903–1907 ===
One of the Linois-class cruisers before 1905

Lavoisier was ordered on 7 January 1903 to take the place of the protected cruiser Isly, which was then the flagship of the Newfoundland and Iceland Naval Division. At that time, the unit also included ironclad Formidable and the protected cruiser Tage. The ship was recommissioned on 16 March after a crew was assembled and she got underway on 5 May, bound for Saint Pierre and Miquelon. After arriving on 23 May, she began fishery protection duties, which were conducted in conjunction with British Royal Navy vessels in the area. Between June and September, she alternated between patrolling the fisheries and making calls in ports around Newfoundland. She departed on 22 September, the fishing season over, and arrived in Lorient a week later. She remained there until being laid up on 11 October; her crew was reduced to a caretaker contingent of 83 men.

The ship was ordered to return to North American waters as the station flagship on 25 January 1904 and she was recommissioned on 29 March. At that time, the unit also included the protected cruiser Troude. Lavoisier departed Lorient on 7 May carrying a doctor for the French settlements on Saint Pierre and Miquelon. The ship stopped at Horta in the Portuguese Azores on the way and reached Saint Pierre on 24 May. After arriving, Lavoisier was visited by the commodore in command of the British counterpart division. In July, she made a stop at Cap-Rouge, Canada, after a confrontation between French and Canadian fishing vessels in the area. Lavoisier departed North American waters on 18 September, arrived back in Lorient on 2 October, and was decommissioned on 15 October.

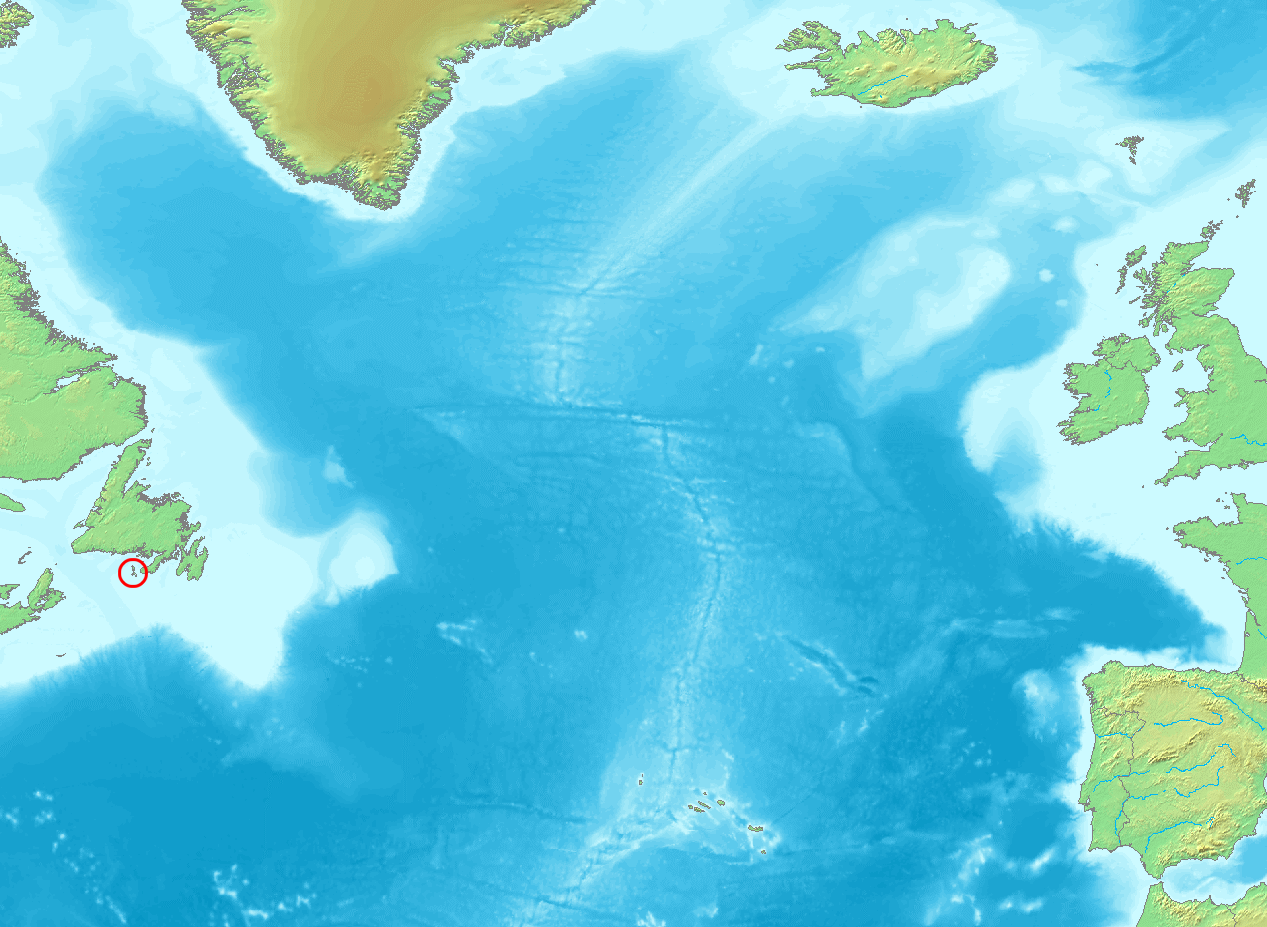
Map of the north Atlantic; Saint Pierre and Miquelon is highlighted in red, the island of Newfoundland is directly to the north, and Iceland is center-right at the top

The year 1905 followed a similar pattern, and Lavoisier was recommissioned on 28 March for another tour with the Newfoundland and Iceland Division. She got underway on 19 April and proceeded first to Greenock, Britain, which she reached two days later. From there, she sailed to Reykjavík, Iceland, arriving on 3 May. She operated out of the port for the next three months, and during that period, her crew assisted in the construction of a hospital and a radio station in Reykjavík. Lavoisier departed on 2 August to return to Greenock three days later; from there, she steamed to Saint Pierre and Miquelon. The ship moved to Newfoundland on 16 September before returning to Lorient on 11 October, where she was again reduced to reserve status on 26 October.

Lavoisier was recommissioned on 1 March 1906 for another stint in the North American fisheries. She departed on 3 April and stopped in Greenock two days later, sailed north to the Faroe Islands and ultimately arrived in Reykjavík on 18 April. The ship made a series of visits to various ports along the coast of Iceland from May to July. Lavoisier steamed to Leith, Britain, in July to pick up the French ambassador to Denmark on 29 July. She carried him to visit the Faroes and Iceland before returning him to Greenock on 13 August. From there, she got underway for Newfoundland by way of Horta, for another month of fisheries patrolling. She returned to Lorient on 2 October and was once again laid up for the winter. Lavoisier was recommissioned on 20 March 1907 for another tour off North America, departing Lorient on 8 May and reaching Reykjavík on 21 May. She operated in the station area until August, when she left for a visit to Scandinavia. She stopped in Leith on 24 August on the way and arrived in Bergen, Norway, on 1 September. She moved to Oslo on 16 September and she was visited by the Norwegian royal family there. She visited Copenhagen, Denmark, two days later, and then returned to Lorient to be decommissioned.

=== 1908–1914 ===
The ship remained out of service until 20 May 1908, when she was recommissioned for another voyage to Iceland that lasted through mid-August. She returned to Lorient by way of Leith, arriving in 25 August, where her crew began preparations for a voyage to Morocco. She carried a group of French Parliament members from Rochefort to Lorient on 21–22 September, and four days later, she departed for Tangier, Morocco. She arrived there three days later and proceeded to Mazagan on 2 October. Lavoisier then steamed north to Gibraltar on 23 December and then returned to Lorient four days later. Unlike previous years, the ship remained in commission through the winter. The ship departed for another patrol off Iceland on 15 April. From 21 to 25 May, she joined the search for the missing fishing trawler Emile-Marie. After leaving the unsuccessful search effort, Lavoisier returned to Greenock to replenish her coal stores. She cruised off Iceland in June and made another visit to Bergen on the last day of the month. From there, she carried the French ambassador to Norway on a series of visits to Ålesund, Molde, Hammerfest, Narvik, and Trondheim that lasted from 4 to 29 July. She was back off Iceland in August and returned to Lorient on 1 September, where she was decommissioned on 23 September.

Lavoisier was recommissioned on 10 March 1910 and departed Lorient for Iceland on 12 April, where she remained through mid-June. From 21 June to 5 August, she made another tour of Norway with the French ambassador aboard. During this period, on 12 July, while Lavoisier met the yacht of the German Kaiser Wilhelm II, Hohenzollern, in Bergen. Wilhelm II came aboard Lavoisier. In August, the ship returned to Iceland and carried the local French consul for an investigation of several French fishing vessels that had been wrecked recently. The ship stopped in Dublin on 10 September on the way back to Lorient, which she reached five days later. She was decommissioned on 1 October and recommissioned on 15 March 1911 for another tour with the Newfoundland and Iceland Division. As with the previous year, she patrolled off Iceland from April to late June, after which she made another visit to Norway, once again with the French ambassador aboard. She visited Ireland in August, including a stop in Dublin on the 28th. She thereafter returned to Lorient, where she was dry docked for periodic maintenance from 7 to 19 September. She was transferred back to Morocco, where she replaced the cruiser Forbin on 27 September. Lavoisier steamed north to Rochefort on 23 December, where she remained through the winter, still in commission.

On 4 March 1912, the ship departed Rochefort for another tour off Iceland, stopping in Cherbourg and Bergen, coaling and taking on supplies at the latter port. She reached Iceland on 21 March, where she remained through mid July, returning to Rochefort on 19 July. She sailed for Tangier on 1 September, operating with Forbin as the Moroccan Naval Division. Over the course of the following four months, she made stops in Salé, Casablanca, Mogador, and Safi, Morocco, and Gibraltar before returning to Rochefort on 18 December. Lavoisier sailed on 4 April 1913 for another cruise in Icelandic waters that concluded with her departure from Reykjavík on 17 July. After a stop in the Faroes on the way home, she was decommissioned in Rochefort on 15 September. The ship was recommissioned again in March 1914 and departed on 4 April for what was to be her final peacetime voyage to the North Atlantic fisheries. Lavoisier left Seyðisfjörður, Iceland, on 6 July for another visit to Norway. She was in Copenhagen on 19 July when she was ordered to join the dreadnought battleships France and Jean Bart carrying President Raymond Poincaré to the Baltic Sea in the midst of the July Crisis. Lavoisier went to Stockholm, Sweden, on 25 July and returned to Copenhagen two days later, while the two battleships immediately returned to France owing to the imminent threat of war. Lavoisier then returned to Rochefort to begin preparations for mobilization. War broke out between France and Germany on 4 August.

=== World War I ===
With the opening of hostilities, Lavoisier was assigned to the 2nd Light Squadron, which at that time consisted of the armored cruisers Marseillaise, Amiral Aube, Jeanne d'Arc, Gloire, Gueydon, and Dupetit-Thouars. The unit was based in Brest, France, and along with Lavoisier, the squadron was strengthened by the addition of several other cruisers over the following days, including the armored cruisers Kléber and Desaix, the protected cruisers Châteaurenault, D'Estrées, Friant, and Guichen, and several auxiliary cruisers. The ships then conducted a series of patrols in the English Channel in conjunction with a force of four British cruisers. On 25 August, several of the cruisers were detached for other operations, but Lavoisier remained in the squadron, becoming its flagship. The French moved their patrol line further west after German U-boats were observed passing through the Channel. Lavoisier stopped at Dunkerque on 5 January 1915 before returning to patrol duties in the western Channel. During this period, she operated out of Cherbourg.

Over the course of 1915, the French gradually withdrew vessels from the unit, and Lavoisier was transferred to the Mediterranean on 17 December to join the main fleet. She stopped at Bizerte in French Tunisia on 23 December en route to the eastern Mediterranean, Malta three days later, and Port Said, Egypt, on the 30th. Between 6 January 1916 and 6 February, she made a series of voyages between Malta and the main fleet anchorage at Corfu in the Ionian Sea. On 10 February, she was reassigned to the Western Mediterranean Patrol Division. She got underway on 24 February to search for the U-boat U-28 after the latter had sunk a pair of French and British ships the day before. The search continued until 5 March, by which time the U-boat had sunk another five merchant vessels. Lavoisier then sailed to Toulon on 10 March. She was reassigned to the Ocean Patrol Division in company with the protected cruiser Surcouf on 2 April, but after arriving in Brest on 20 April, Lavoisier was found to be in need of repairs. She was sent to Saint Nazaire to have cracks in her hull repaired and an overhaul of her boilers carried out.

By the time work on Lavoisier had been completed on 28 August, the French naval command had changed her orders again, sending her to relieve the protected cruiser D'Entrecasteaux in the Moroccan Naval Division. She operated there in company with Forbin from 14 September through May 1917, conducting patrols off the coast of Morocco. She also made stops in Casablanca, Mogador, Agadir, Tangier, and Gibraltar during this period. Lavoisier was detached for additional repairs in Bordeaux in June, which were completed in December. She returned to Moroccan waters in January 1918. She conducted patrol operations from January to June, thereafter being transferred to the Syrian Naval Division, which was based at Port Said. She remained there through the end of the war in November 1918.

=== Later career ===
Lavoisier and continued operating off the coast of Syria through April 1919, and during this period she stopped in Beirut in May. She returned to Rochefort in July and was decommissioned there in August. On 28 November, she was scheduled to be discarded and she was struck from the Navy Directory in early 1920 after some twenty-three years of service. Lavoisier was subsequently broken up.
