= French cruiser Cassard =

Protected cruiser of the French Navy

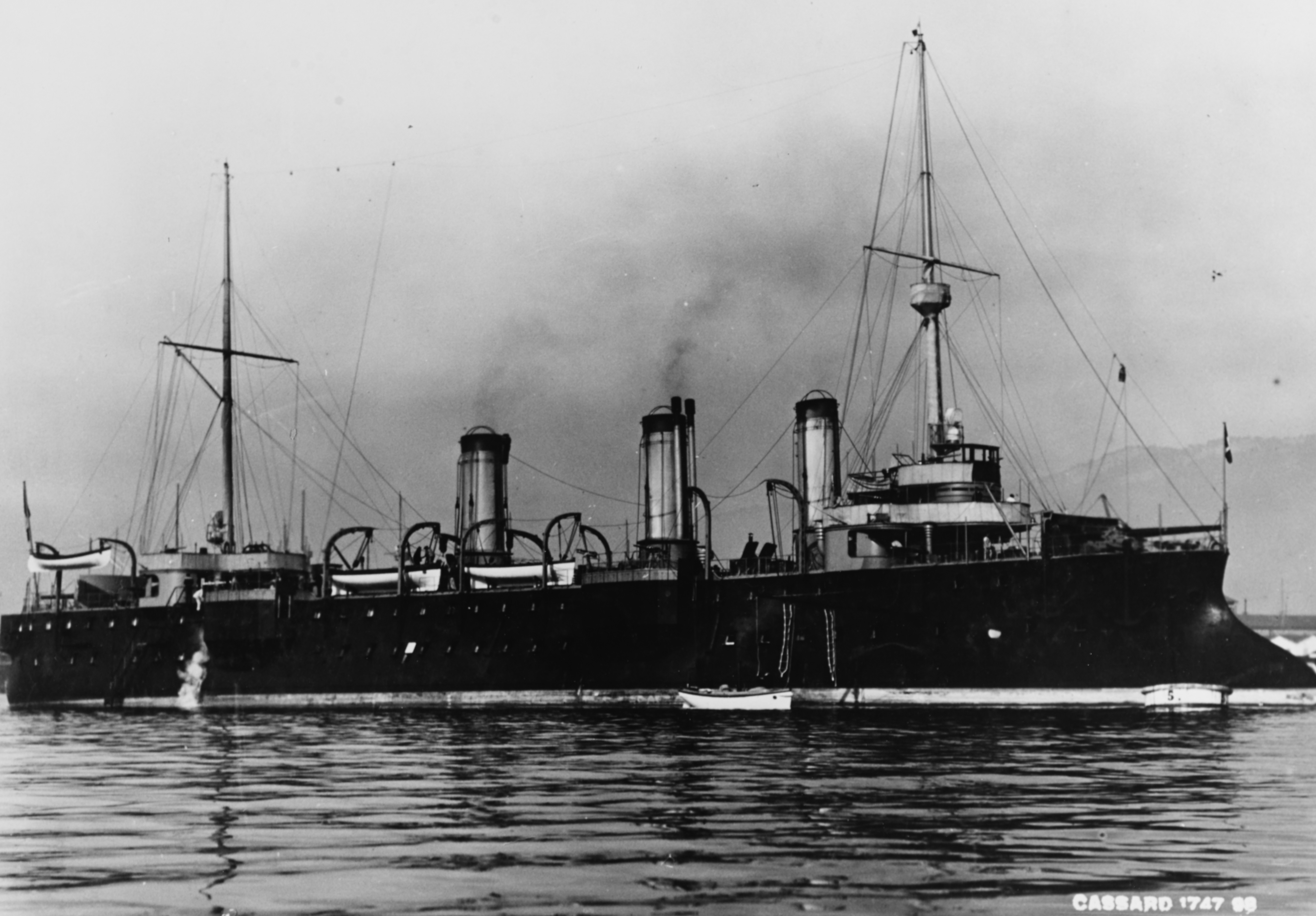
- Cassard

History

France
- Name: Cassard
- Namesake: Jacques Cassard
- Builder: Arsenal de Cherbourg
- Laid down: 22 October 1894
- Launched: 27 May 1896
- Commissioned: 21 June 1897
- Stricken: 27 July 1924
- Fate: Broken up, 1925

General characteristics
- Class & type: D'Assas-class cruiser
- Displacement: 3,957.1 t (3,894.6 long tons; 4,362.0 short tons)
- Length: 99.65 m (326 ft 11 in) loa
- Beam: 13.68 m (44 ft 11 in)
- Draft: 5.8 m (19 ft 0 in)
- Installed power: 20 × water-tube boilers; 10,000 ihp (7,500 kW)
- Propulsion: 2 × triple-expansion steam engines; 2 × screw propellers
- Speed: 20 knots (37 km/h; 23 mph)
- Range: 6,000 nmi (11,000 km; 6,900 mi) at 10 knots (19 km/h; 12 mph)
- Complement: 370–392
- Armament: 6 × 164.7 mm (6.5 in) guns; 4 × 100 mm (3.9 in) guns; 10 × 47 mm (1.9 in) guns; 2 × 37 mm (1.5 in) guns; 3 × 37 mm Hotchkiss revolver cannon; 2 × 356 mm (14 in) torpedo tubes
- Armor: Deck: 30 to 80 mm (1.2 to 3.1 in); Conning tower: 60 mm (2.4 in); Gun shields: 54 mm (2.1 in)

Cassard was a D'Assas-class protected cruiser built for the French Navy in the 1890s. The D'Assas-class cruisers were ordered as part of a construction program directed at strengthening the fleet's cruiser force at a time the country was concerned with the growing naval threat of the Italian and German fleets. The new cruisers were intended to serve with the main fleet and overseas in the French colonial empire. Cassard was armed with a main battery of six 164 mm (6.5 in) guns, was protected by an armor deck that was 70 to 80 mm (2.8 to 3.1 in) thick, and was capable of steaming at a top speed of 20 knots (37 km/h; 23 mph).

Cassard entered service in 1898, joining the Mediterranean Squadron, where she served for the following several years. During this period, she was occupied primarily with routine training exercises. She had been reduced to the reserve fleet by 1905, though she was reactivated in 1908 for a deployment to French Morocco. At the start of World War I in 1914, she initially operated out of Morocco, patrolling for German U-boats. In September, she bombarded local villages in Morocco to suppress challenges to French colonial rule. The ship was later transferred to the western Mediterranean and Red Seas, along with a deployment to the Indian Ocean in 1917. After the war, Cassard was partially disarmed and converted into a gunnery training ship, though she was struck from the naval register in 1924, grounded for use as a target ship, and then sold for scrap in 1925.

== Design ==
In response to a war scare with Italy in the late 1880s, the French Navy embarked on a major construction program in 1890 to counter the threat of the Italian fleet and that of Italy's ally Germany. The plan called for a total of seventy cruisers for use in home waters and overseas in the French colonial empire. The D'Assas class, which also included Du Chayla and D'Assas, was ordered as part of the program. Their design was heavily drawn from that of the preceding Friant-class cruisers, being slightly longer and wider, which improved speed and stability.

Cassard was 99.65 m (326 ft 11 in) long overall, with a beam of 13.68 m (44 ft 11 in) and an average draft of 5.8 m (19 ft 0 in). She displaced 3,957.1 t (3,894.6 long tons; 4,362.0 short tons) as designed. Her crew varied over the course of her career, and consisted of 370–392 officers and enlisted men. The ship's propulsion system consisted of a pair of triple-expansion steam engines driving two screw propellers. Steam was provided by twenty coal-burning Lagrafel d'Allest water-tube boilers that were ducted into three funnels. Her machinery was rated to produce 10,000 indicated horsepower (7,500 kW) for a top speed of 20 knots (37 km/h; 23 mph). She had a cruising radius of 6,000 nautical miles (11,000 km; 6,900 mi) at 10 knots (19 km/h; 12 mph) and 1,000 nmi (1,900 km; 1,200 mi) at 20 knots.

The ship was armed with a main battery of six 164.7 mm (6.5 in) guns. They were placed in individual pivot mounts; one was on the forecastle, two were in sponsons abreast the forward conning tower, and the last was on the stern. These were supported by a secondary battery of four 100 mm (3.9 in) guns, which were carried in pivot mounts in the fore and aft conning towers, one on each side per tower. For close-range defense against torpedo boats, she carried ten 47 mm (1.9 in) 3-pounder Hotchkiss guns, two 37 mm (1.5 in) 1-pounder guns, and three 37 mm Hotchkiss revolver cannon. She was also armed with two 356 mm (14 in) torpedo tubes in her hull above the waterline. Armor protection consisted of a curved armor deck that was 30 to 80 mm (1.2 to 3.1 in) thick, along with 60 mm (2.4 in) plating on the conning tower. The main and secondary guns were fitted with 54 mm (2.1 in) thick gun shields.

=== Modifications ===
The ship lost her 37 mm revolving cannon in 1902. In 1917, Cassard had most of her guns removed for use elsewhere, leaving her with just two 164.7 mm guns. The following year, four 90 mm (3.5 in) M1877 guns were installed, and in 1919, a pair of 47 mm (1.9 in) guns that had been taken from Du Chayla were added. In 1921, by which time Cassard had been assigned to the gunnery school, she was refitted with a single 164.7 mm gun aft, one 138.6 mm gun forward, two 90 mm guns in the forward sponsons, two 75 mm (3 in) guns in the aft sponsons, and two 47 mm guns to provide a variety of guns with which to train the fleet's gunners.

== Service history ==
The contract for Cassard was placed on 17 October 1893, and she was placed on the Navy's list in January 1894. Work on the ship began with her keel laying at the Arsenal de Cherbourg shipyard on 22 October 1894. She was launched on 27 May 1896 and was commissioned to begin sea trials on 21 June 1897. These were completed by 7 February 1898, when she was placed in full commission. During the trials, she reached a maximum of 19.8 knots (36.7 km/h; 22.8 mph) using forced draft. The ship was named for the 18th century naval officer Jacques Cassard. On 9 September, Cassard departed Cherbourg for Toulon on the French Mediterranean coast, arriving there seven days later. She entered service in time to take part in the annual fleet maneuvers with the Escadre de la Méditerranée (Mediterranean Squadron), France's primary battle fleet. The exercises that year lasted from 5 to 25 July. The next year, she was formally assigned to the Mediterranean Squadron. At that time, it consisted of six pre-dreadnought battleships, three armored cruisers, seven other protected cruisers, and several smaller vessels.

Cassard operated with the Mediterranean Squadron in 1900, which was stationed in Toulon. On 6 March, Cassard joined several pre-dreadnought battleships and the protected cruisers Du Chayla, Lavoisier, and Galilée for maneuvers off Golfe-Juan on the Côte d'Azur, including night firing training. Over the course of April, the ships visited numerous French ports along the Mediterranean coast, and on 31 May the fleet steamed to Corsica for a visit that lasted until 8 June. She then took part in the fleet maneuvers that began later that month as part of Group II, along with Cassard and Galilée. The maneuvers included a blockade conducted by Group II in late June, and after completing its own exercises, the Mediterranean Squadron rendezvoused with the Escadre du Nord (Northern Squadron) off Lisbon, Portugal in late June before proceeding to Quiberon Bay for joint maneuvers in July. The maneuvers concluded with a naval review in Cherbourg on 19 July for President Émile Loubet. On 1 August, the Mediterranean Fleet departed for Toulon, arriving on 14 August.

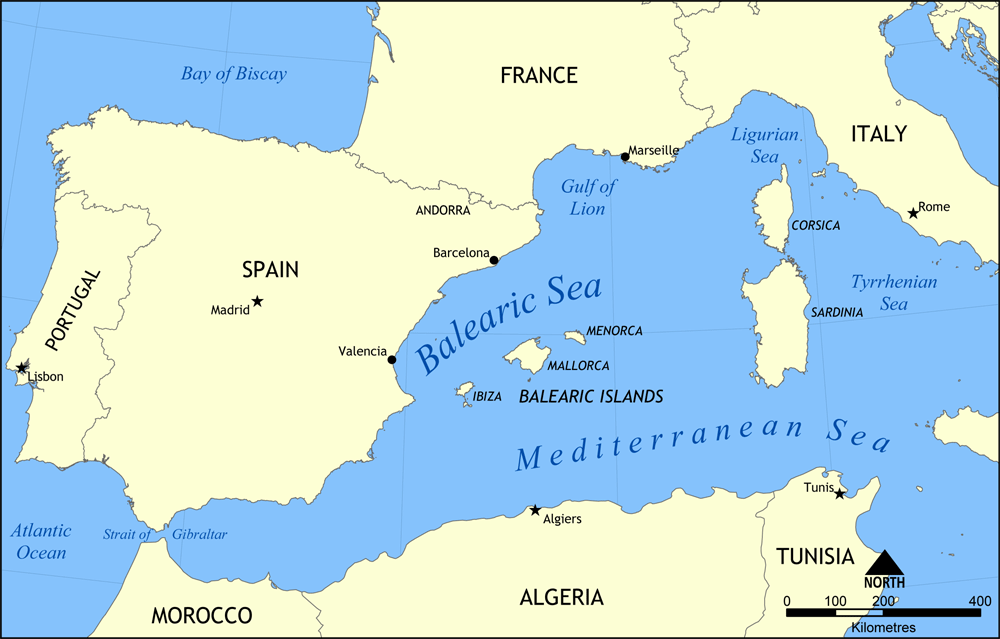
Map of the western Mediterranean, where Cassard operated for much of her career

She remained with the Mediterranean Squadron the following year. That year, the annual fleet maneuvers were conducted from 3 to 28 July. During the exercises, the Northern Squadron steamed south for joint maneuvers with the Mediterranean Squadron. The Northern Squadron ships formed part of the hostile force, and as it was entering the Mediterranean from the Atlantic, represented a German squadron attempting to meet its Italian allies. On 30 October, Cassard joined elements of the Mediterranean Squadron to conduct what were purported to be tests with wireless telegraphy, but was in fact a show of force in the Aegean Sea to intimidate the Ottoman Empire. Relations between the two countries were poor at the time. On 6 November, two of the battleships and several cruisers—though not Cassard—were detached to sail east for the operation. The ships then re-formed and arrived back in Toulon on 9 December.

The ship continued to serve in the squadron through 1902. During the 1902 fleet maneuvers, which began on 7 July, the Northern Squadron attempted to force a passage through the Strait of Gibraltar. The cruisers of the Mediterranean Squadron, including Cassard, conducted patrols from their base at Mers El Kébir to observe their entrance and signal the rest of the fleet. After successfully detecting the simulated enemy squadron, they shadowed the vessels until the rest of the Mediterranean Squadron assembled, but the Northern Squadron commander was able to shake his pursuers long enough to prevent them from intercepting his force before the end of the exercises on 15 July. Further maneuvers with the combined fleet took place, concluding on 5 August.

At some point in early 1904, the ship ran aground off Toulon, but suffered only minor damage to her port screw. At some point thereafter, Cassard was reduced to the reserve fleet. The reserve ships, including Cassard, were activated to take part in the fleet maneuvers with the Mediterranean Squadron in 1905. The exercises lasted from 3 July to 3 August. She was recommissioned in Toulon in 1908 to replace a cruiser stationed in French Morocco. Later that year, the French Navy decided to convert Cassard into a fast minelayer.

=== World War I ===
By the start of World War I in August 1914, the ship lay at Casablanca in French Morocco. She was assigned to the Division du Maroc (Morocco Division), along with the protected cruiser Cosmao. The two cruisers, soon to be joined by the armored cruisers Amiral Charner, Bruix, and Latouche-Tréville, were tasked with patrolling the sea lanes off the coast of northwestern Africa and protect merchant shipping from commerce raiders. They were also responsible for escorting convoys and patrolling anchorages in the Canary Islands to ensure German U-boats were not using them to refuel. The cruisers operated out of Oran, French Morocco. On 19 August, Cassard embarked the German and Austro-Hungarian chargés d'affaires in Tangiers after they had been expelled from French territory, and carried them to Salerno in then still-neutral Italy, where they could be repatriated.

By late September, it had become clear that German raiders were not operating in the area, so the armored cruisers were transferred elsewhere, though Cassard remained on station with Cosmao, and they were joined by the protected cruiser Friant. The three cruisers patrolled for German arms shipments to Spain and Spanish Morocco. On 26 September, Cassard and the British armed merchant cruiser Victorian conducted a sweep along the Moroccan coast, bombarding villages to suppress unrest against French rule. By March 1915, the Morocco Division consisted of Cassard, Friant, and Cosmao. Cassard later spent most of her time in the western Mediterranean Sea or the Red Sea on patrol duties. She was deployed briefly to the Indian Ocean in 1917. On 7 May 1917, she arrived in Bordeaux to have most of her guns removed, remaining inactive until early 1918, by which further alterations to her armament were completed. In March, she resumed patrol duties in the Mediterranean and Red Seas, which she carried out through the end of the war.

After the war, she operated in the eastern Mediterranean. On 3 March 1919, she was present in Port Said, Egypt, along with Cosmao and a pair of destroyers, where she met the British battlecruiser HMS New Zealand, which was at that time conducting a tour of the British Empire with Admiral John Jellicoe aboard. Cassard, then the flagship of Vice Admiral Varney, hosted Jellicoe for a meeting with Varney. In 1921, the ship was converted into a gunnery training ship, though she served in that role for a brief period of time. She was to be sold to the Polish Navy in early 1924, and as a result, she was disarmed for the transfer in February, but the deal fell through. The ship was instead struck from the naval register on 27 July before being run aground in the mouth of the Rhône for use as a target ship. The wreck was then sold on 25 November 1925 to a French ship-breaking firm in Toulon.
