= French cruiser D'Assas =

Protected cruiser of the French Navy

- D'Assas; note her yards tilted in opposite directions, a sign of mourning

History

France
- Name: D'Assas
- Ordered: 15 November 1893
- Builder: Ateliers et Chantiers de la Loire
- Laid down: 1 April 1894
- Launched: 28 March 1896
- Completed: 23 April 1898
- Commissioned: 24 March 1897
- Decommissioned: 1 January 1908
- Stricken: 9 September 1910
- Fate: Broken up

General characteristics
- Class & type: D'Assas-class cruiser
- Displacement: 3,944.6 t (3,882.3 long tons; 4,348.2 short tons)
- Length: 99.64 m (326 ft 11 in) loa
- Beam: 13.68 m (44 ft 11 in)
- Draft: 5.8 m (19 ft 0 in)
- Installed power: 20 × water-tube boilers; 10,000 ihp (7,500 kW)
- Propulsion: 2 × triple-expansion steam engines; 2 × screw propellers
- Speed: 20 knots (37 km/h; 23 mph)
- Range: 6,000 nmi (11,000 km; 6,900 mi) at 10 knots (19 km/h; 12 mph)
- Complement: 370–392
- Armament: 6 × 164.7 mm (6.5 in) guns; 4 × 100 mm (3.9 in) guns; 10 × 47 mm (1.9 in) guns; 2 × 37 mm (1.5 in) guns; 3 × 37 mm Hotchkiss revolver cannon; 2 × 356 mm (14 in) torpedo tubes
- Armor: Deck: 30 to 80 mm (1.2 to 3.1 in); Conning tower:80 mm; Gun shields: 54 mm (2.1 in)

D'Assas was the lead ship of her class of protected cruisers built for the French Navy in the 1890s. The D'Assas-class cruisers were ordered as part of a construction program directed at strengthening the fleet's cruiser force. At the time, France was concerned with the growing naval threat of the Italian and German fleets, and the new cruisers were intended to serve with the main fleet, and overseas in the French colonial empire. D'Assas was armed with a main battery of six 164 mm (6.5 in) guns, was protected by an armor deck that was 70 to 80 mm (2.8 to 3.1 in) thick, and was capable of steaming at a top speed of 20 knots (37 km/h; 23 mph).

D'Assas initially served with the Mediterranean Squadron after entering service in 1898, and by 1901, she had been transferred to the Northern Squadron. During this period, she was occupied with routine peacetime training exercises with the rest of the main French fleets in home waters. In 1904, she was assigned to France's cruiser squadron in East Asia, and the following year, she assisted with the unsuccessful attempt to re-float the armored cruiser Sully after it ran aground. D'Assas passed the next several years uneventfully and was struck from the naval register in 1910; she was then used as a storage hulk before being sold to ship breakers in 1914.

== Design ==
In response to a war scare with Italy in the late 1880s, the French Navy embarked on a major construction program in 1890 to counter the threat of the Italian fleet and that of Italy's ally Germany. The plan called for a total of seventy cruisers for use in home waters and overseas in the French colonial empire. The D'Assas class, which also included Du Chayla and Cassard, was ordered as part of the program. Their design was heavily drawn from that of the preceding Friant-class cruisers, being slightly longer and wider, which improved speed and stability.

D'Assas was 99.64 m (326 ft 11 in) long overall, with a beam of 13.68 m (44 ft 11 in) and an average draft of 5.8 m (19 ft 0 in). She displaced 3,944.6 t (3,882.3 long tons; 4,348.2 short tons) as designed. Her crew varied over the course of her career, and consisted of 370–392 officers and enlisted men. The ship's propulsion system consisted of a pair of triple-expansion steam engines driving two screw propellers. Steam was provided by twenty coal-burning Lagrafel d'Allest water-tube boilers that were ducted into three funnels. Her machinery was rated to produce 10,000 indicated horsepower (7,500 kW) for a top speed of 20 knots (37 km/h; 23 mph). She had a cruising radius of 6,000 nautical miles (11,000 km; 6,900 mi) at 10 knots (19 km/h; 12 mph) and 1,000 nmi (1,900 km; 1,200 mi) at 20 knots. In service, D'Assas proved to have significant stability problems and had to be ballasted to correct the problem.

The ship was armed with a main battery of six 164.7 mm (6.5 in) guns. They were placed in individual pivot mounts; one was on the forecastle, two were in sponsons abreast the forward conning tower, and the last was on the stern. These were supported by a secondary battery of four 100 mm (3.9 in) guns, which were carried in pivot mounts in the fore and aft conning towers, one on each side per tower. For close-range defense against torpedo boats, she carried ten 47 mm (1.9 in) 3-pounder Hotchkiss guns, two 37 mm (1.5 in) 1-pounder guns, and three 37 mm Hotchkiss revolver cannon. She was also armed with two 356 mm (14 in) torpedo tubes in her hull above the waterline. Armor protection consisted of a curved armor deck that was 30 to 80 mm (1.2 to 3.1 in) thick, along with 80 mm plating on the conning tower. The main and secondary guns were fitted with 54 mm (2.1 in) thick gun shields.

== Service history ==
D'Assas steaming at high speed

D'Assas was ordered on 15 November 1893 and was laid down at the Ateliers et Chantiers de la Loire shipyard in Nantes on 1 April 1894. She was launched on 28 March 1896 and was commissioned to begin sea trials on 24 March 1898. These lasted just over a year, and she was placed in full commission for active service on 23 April 1898. She was the last member of her class to enter service. The ship departed Brest on 29 April, bound for Toulon on the Mediterranean coast, arriving there on 5 May. Upon arrival, she was dry-docked for repairs, which were completed by mid-July. She got underway on the 17th to join the Reserve Squadron, which was at that time taking part in the annual fleet maneuvers with the Mediterranean Squadron, France's primary battle fleet. The exercises that year had begun on 5 July and concluded on 25 July.

In 1899, D'Assas was formally assigned to the Mediterranean Squadron. At that time, the unit consisted of six pre-dreadnought battleships, three armored cruisers, seven other protected cruisers, and several smaller vessels. On 3 April, D'Assas sailed from Toulon to bring Jean-Baptiste Marchand and his expedition back from Djibouti in French Somaliland; Marchand had led the French expedition that led to the Fashoda Incident the previous year.

By January 1901, D'Assas had been assigned to the Northern Squadron, which was stationed in Brest, France. The squadron at that time consisted of two pre-dreadnoughts, four ironclads, four coastal defense ships, two armored cruisers, and one other protected cruiser, along with several smaller vessels. That year, the annual fleet maneuvers were conducted from 3 to 28 July. During the exercises, the Northern Squadron steamed south for joint maneuvers with the Mediterranean Squadron. The Northern Squadron ships formed part of the hostile force, and as it was entering the Mediterranean from the Atlantic, represented a German squadron attempting to meet its Italian allies. In August and September, the Northern Squadron conducted amphibious assault exercises. On 28 August, they escorted a group of troop ships from Brest to La Rochelle. The ships conducted a simulated bombardment of the port, neutralized the coastal defenses, and put some 6,000 men ashore. D'Assas remained in the unit through 1902.

=== Deployment to French Indochina ===
D'Assas early in her career

By 1904, D'Assas had been assigned to the Division navale d'Extrême-Orient et du Pacifique occidental (Naval Division of the Far East and Western Pacific), which also included the armored cruisers Gueydon and Sully. D'Assas got underway from Brest on 9 March, bound for Saigon, where she was to replace the protected cruiser Bugeaud. She was tasked with escorting the four destroyers Pistolet, Javeline, Mousquet, and Fronde to the East Asia station, but repeated engine problems with D'Assas forced the destroyers to proceed independently. The cruiser, meanwhile, had to stop for repairs in Algiers in French Algeria and then again at Lubang Buaya in the Dutch East Indies. After arriving in Indochina, D'Assas joined the rest of the unit. On 8 February 1905, while steaming with D'Assas and Gueydon, Sully ran aground and could not free herself. D'Assas and Gueydon took off her crew and began salvage efforts, but the cruiser could not be pulled free, and eventually broke in two.

Throughout her time in East Asian waters, D'Assas was plagued with repeated machinery problems, and by early 1906 the decision was made to recall her to France. She departed Saigon on 30 January and after arrival, she was placed in special reserve on 30 May at Lorient. The French Naval Minister, Gaston Thomson, suggested that D'Assas be converted into a fast minelayer on 24 September 1907, along with her sister ship Cassard. The cost proved to be too great and the proposal came to nothing. Instead, D'Assas was decommissioned on 1 January 1908, though remained idle until being struck from the naval register on 9 September 1910. She was thereafter used as a storage hulk for waste oil at Lorient, a role she filled from 1910 to 1913. She was placed for sale that year, but was not sold until 11 April 1914 to a firm in Copenhagen, Denmark. She was the only member of her class to have been discarded before the start of World War I.
