= D'Assas-class cruiser =

Protected cruiser class of the French Navy

- D'Assas; note her yards tilted in opposite directions, a sign of mourning

Class overview
- Name: D'Assas class
- Builders: Arsenal de Cherbourg; Ateliers et Chantiers de la Loire
- Operators: French Navy
- Preceded by: Descartes class
- Succeeded by: Catinat class
- Built: 1894–1898
- In service: 1898–1924
- Completed: 3
- Retired: 3

General characteristics
- Type: Protected cruiser
- Displacement: 3,944.6 to 3,957.1 t (3,882.3 to 3,894.6 long tons; 4,348.2 to 4,362.0 short tons)
- Length: 99.65 m (326 ft 11 in) loa
- Beam: 13.68 m (44 ft 11 in)
- Draft: 5.8 m (19 ft)
- Installed power: 20 × water-tube boilers; 10,000 ihp (7,500 kW)
- Propulsion: 2 × triple-expansion steam engines; 2 × screw propellers
- Speed: 20 knots (37 km/h; 23 mph)
- Range: 6,000 nmi (11,000 km; 6,900 mi) at 10 knots (19 km/h; 12 mph)
- Complement: 370–392
- Armament: 6 × 164 mm (6.5 in) guns; 4 × 100 mm (3.9 in) guns; 10 × 47 mm (1.9 in) guns; 2 × 37 mm (1.5 in) guns; 3 × 37 mm Hotchkiss revolver cannon; 2 × 356 mm (14 in) torpedo tubes
- Armor: Deck: 30 to 80 mm (1.2 to 3.1 in); Conning tower: 80 mm (Note: For D'Assas; Du Chayla and Cassard had 60 mm (2.4 in) on their conning towers.); Gun shields: 54 mm (2.1 in)

The D'Assas class comprised three protected cruisers of the French Navy built in the early 1890s; the ships were D'Assas, Cassard, and Du Chayla. They were ordered as part of a naval construction program directed at France's rivals, Italy and Germany, particularly after Italy made progress in modernizing its own fleet. The plan was also intended to remedy a deficiency in cruisers that had been revealed during training exercises in the 1880s. As such, the D'Assas-class cruisers were intended to operate as fleet scouts and in the French colonial empire. The ships were armed with a main battery of six 164 mm (6.5 in) guns supported by four 100 mm (3.9 in) guns and they had a top speed of 20 knots (37 km/h; 23 mph). A fourth ship, designated "G3" in the 1894 budget, was authorized but was canceled the following year.

All three ships began service in the Mediterranean Squadron in the late 1890s, though D'Assas was later transferred to the Northern Squadron in 1901 and then to French Indochina in 1904. Du Chayla supported an amphibious landing in French Morocco in 1907 and Cassard joined her there the following year. D'Assas was discarded in 1914, but the other two members of the class saw service during World War I, primarily patrolling the Atlantic for German commerce raiders. Both ships were partially disarmed late in the conflict and Cassard became a gunnery training ship while Du Chayla remained in active service. She took part in the Allied intervention in the Russian Civil War in 1919 before being sold to ship breakers in 1920, while Cassard lingered on in service until 1924, when she, too, was sold for scrap.

== Background ==
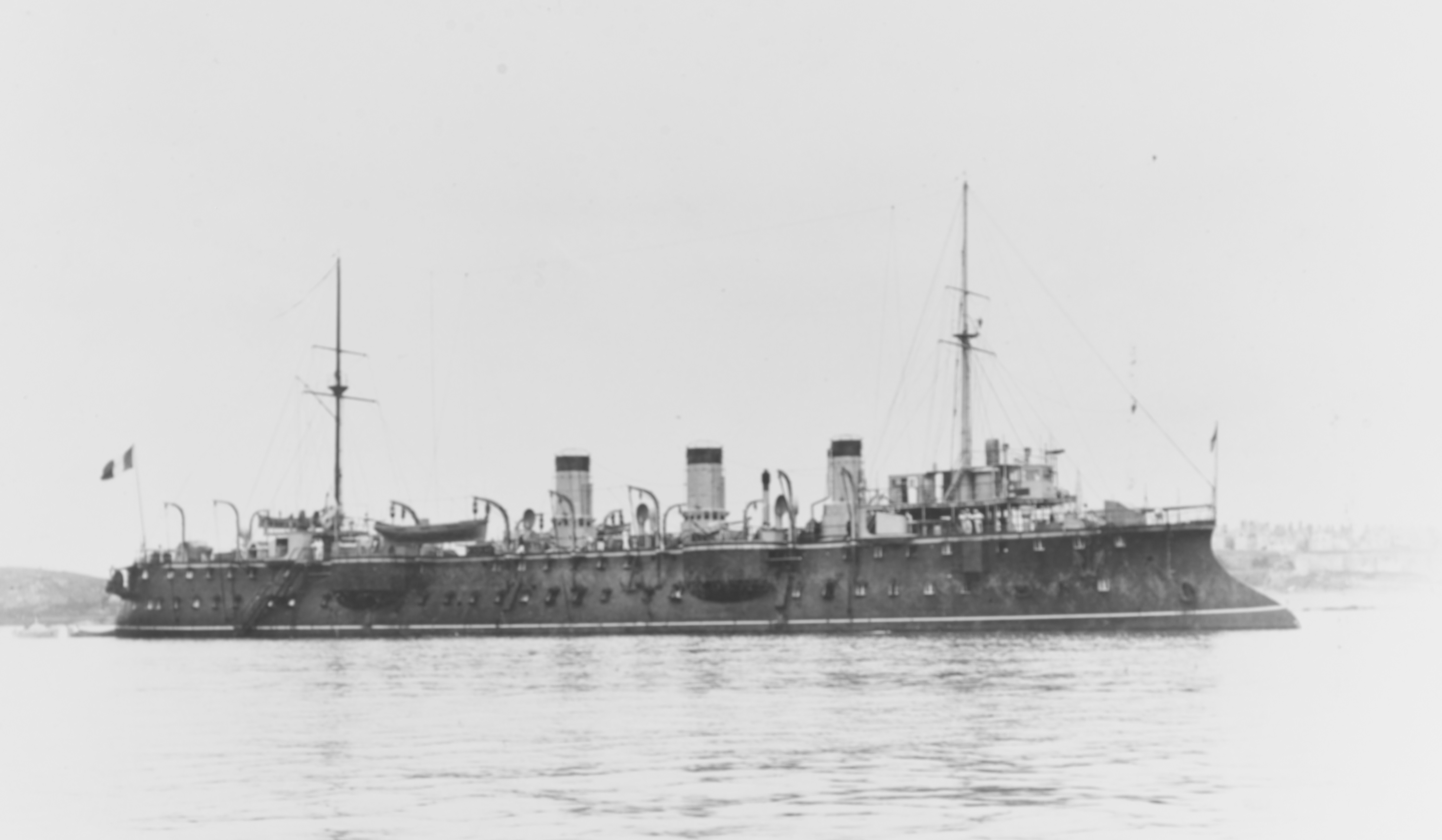
The earlier cruiser Friant, which provided the basis for the D'Assas design

In the late 1880s, the Italian Regia Marina (Royal Navy) accelerated construction of ships for its fleet and reorganized the most modern ironclad battleships—the Duilio and Italia classes—into a fast squadron suitable for offensive operations. These developments provoked a strong response in the French press. The Budget Committee in the French Chamber of Deputies began to press for a "two-power standard" in 1888, which would see the French fleet enlarged to equal the combined Italian and German fleets, then France's two main rivals on the continent. This initially came to nothing, as the supporters of the Jeune École doctrine called for a fleet largely based on squadrons of torpedo boats to defend the French coasts rather than an expensive fleet of ironclads. This view had significant support in the Chamber of Deputies.

The next year, a war scare with Italy led to further outcry to strengthen the fleet. To compound matters, the visit of a German squadron of four ironclads to Italy confirmed French concerns of a combined Italo-German fleet that would dramatically outnumber their own. Training exercises held in France that year demonstrated that the slower French fleet would be unable to prevent the faster Italian squadron from bombarding the French coast at will, in part because it lacked enough cruisers (and doctrine to use them) to scout for the enemy ships.

To correct the weaknesses of the French fleet, on 22 November 1890, the Superior Council authorized a new construction program directed not at simple parity with the Italian and German fleets, but numerical superiority. In addition to twenty-four new battleships, a total of seventy cruisers were to be built for use in home waters and overseas in the French colonial empire. The D'Assas class were ordered to as part of the program, and were very similar to the earlier Friant-class cruisers.

== Design ==
The design for the D'Assas class was prepared by Delphin Albert Lhomme, who based it on the earlier Friant class. Lhomme lengthened the hull by 2.2 m (7 ft 3 in) to add space for additional ammunition storage and widened it by 0.44 m (1 ft 5 in) to improve stability. The longer hull also permitted slightly finer hull lines, and thus greater hydrodynamic efficiency; while the ships of the D'Assas class were faster than those of the Friant type, they still failed to match the top speed of the progenitor of their design lineage, Davout. The larger hull also provided for better ammunition feeding from the magazines to the amidships guns.

=== General characteristics and machinery ===
D'Assas steaming at high speed

The D'Assas-class cruisers were 99.25 m (325 ft 7 in) long between perpendiculars and 99.65 m (326 ft 11 in) long overall. They had a beam of 13.68 m (44 ft 11 in), but the sponsons for the main battery extended to a beam of 14.3 m (46 ft 11 in). The ships had an average draft of 5.8 m (19 ft), which increased to 6.25 m (20 ft 6 in) aft. D'Assas displaced 3,944.6 t (3,882.3 long tons; 4,348.2 short tons), while the other two vessels displaced 3,957.1 t (3,894.6 long tons; 4,362.0 short tons). D'Assas suffered from stability problems and reportedly sat lower in the water than her sister ships.

The ships' hulls featured a pronounced ram bow and a tumblehome shape, which were common characteristics of major French warships of the period. The ram bow was not reinforced to permit it to actually be used to ram enemy vessels. They had a flush deck with a sloped stern. Their superstructure consisted of a main conning tower with a bridge forward and a smaller, secondary conning tower aft. The ships were fitted with a pair of pole masts with spotting tops for observation and signaling purposes. The masts each held a searchlight, and another pair of lights were placed in the hull forward, and two more were placed toward the stern. Their crew varied over the course of their careers and ranged from 370 to 392 officers and enlisted men.

The ships' propulsion system consisted of a pair of 4-cylinder vertical triple-expansion steam engines driving two screw propellers for D'Assas and Cassard, while Du Chayla received 3-cylinder engines. Steam was provided by twenty coal-burning Lagrafel d'Allest water-tube boilers that were ducted into three funnels on the centerline amidships. Their machinery was rated to produce 10,000 indicated horsepower (7,500 kW) for a top speed of 19.8 knots (36.7 km/h; 22.8 mph), which all three ships met on their initial speed tests, achieving speeds of 19.8 to 19.86 knots (36.67 to 36.78 km/h; 22.79 to 22.85 mph) from 9,500 to 10,143 ihp (7,084 to 7,564 kW). Coal storage amounted to 800 long tons (810 t), which permitted a cruising radius of 6,000 nautical miles (11,000 km; 6,900 mi) at 10 knots (19 km/h; 12 mph) and 1,000 nmi (1,900 km; 1,200 mi) at 20 knots according to a contemporary report from the United States' Office of Naval Intelligence, though the modern historian Stephen Roberts credits the ships with a range of 6,350 nmi (11,760 km; 7,310 mi) at ten knots.

=== Armament and armor ===
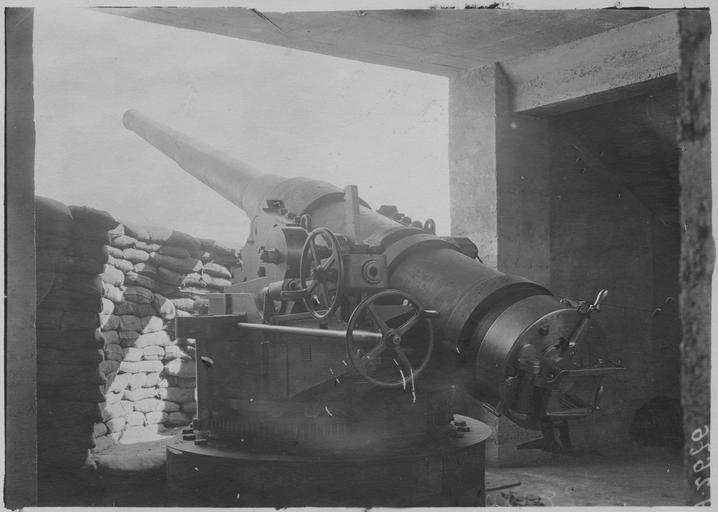
A 164.7 mm (6.48 in) Modèle 1893 gun converted for use ashore during World War I

The ships were armed with a main battery of six 164.7 mm (6.48 in) Modèle 1893 45-caliber guns, except Du Chayla, which received six earlier M1887 pattern guns of the same bore diameter. They were placed in individual pivot mounts; one was on the forecastle, two were in sponsons abreast the forward conning tower, another pair was in sponsons further aft, and the last gun was on the stern. The guns fired a variety of shells, including solid cast iron projectiles, and explosive armor-piercing (AP) and semi-armor-piercing shells. The muzzle velocity ranged from 770 to 880 m/s (2,500 to 2,900 ft/s). These were supported by a secondary battery of four 100 mm (3.9 in) Modèle 1891 guns, which were carried in pivot mounts in the conning towers, one on each side per tower. The guns fired 14 kg (31 lb) cast iron and 16 kg (35 lb) AP shells with a muzzle velocity of 710 to 740 m/s (2,300 to 2,400 ft/s).

For close-range defense against torpedo boats, they carried ten 47 mm (1.9 in) M1885 3-pounder Hotchkiss guns, two 37 mm (1.5 in) M1885 1-pounder guns, and three 37 mm Hotchkiss revolver cannon, all in individual mounts. The ships were also armed with two 356 mm (14 in) torpedo tubes in their hull above the waterline according to the naval historian Stephen Roberts in French Warships in the Age of Steam, though Conway's All the World's Fighting Ships lists the diameter of the torpedoes as 450 mm (17.7 in).

Armor protection consisted of a curved armor deck that was 30 mm (1.2 in) thick on the flat portion, increasing to 80 mm (3.1 in) on the sides that sloped down to the side of the hull. The deck consisted of extra mild steel, and was layered on top of 20 mm (0.79 in) of hull plating. Above the deck at the sides, a cofferdam filled with cellulose was intended to contain flooding from damage below the waterline. Below the main deck, a thin splinter deck that was 6 m (20 ft) thick covered the propulsion machinery spaces and ammunition magazines to protect them from shell fragments. The conning towers aboard Du Chayla and Cassard had 60 mm (2.4 in) thick plating on the sides, while D'Assas received 80 mm plating for her tower. The main and secondary guns were fitted with 54 mm (2.1 in) gun shields.

=== Modifications ===
The ships underwent a series of changes to their armament over the course of their careers. In 1898, around the time Cassard and Du Chayla were placed in full commission, the light armament was revised to six 47 mm guns, and a third 37 mm QF gun was added and by 1902, the Hotchkiss revolvers were removed from both vessels. For D'Assas, another three 37 mm guns had been added in 1901, but she retained her revolver cannon until 1906. That year, Cassard lost her torpedo tubes, and Du Chayla had hers removed in 1908.

Cassard and Du Chayla both lost much of their weaponry during World War I so the guns could be used in other vessels or ashore by the French Army. By 1917, Cassard's armament had been reduced to just two of her 164.7 mm guns. The following year, she had four 90 mm (3.5 in) M1877 guns added. Also in 1918, Du Chayla had her armament reduced to two 164.7 mm guns, four 75 mm (3 in) M1897 guns in her sponsons, and four 47 mm guns. In 1919, two of Du Chayla's 47 mm guns were transferred to Cassard. Cassard was rearmed a final time after the war in 1921, by which time she was serving as a gunnery training ships. For that purpose, she was fitted with a variety of guns, including one 164.7 mm gun aft, one 138.6 mm (5.46 in) gun in the bow position, two 90 mm guns in the forward pair of sponsons, two 75 mm guns in the aft sponsons, and two 47 mm guns.

== Construction ==
Construction data
Name	Ordered	Laid down	Launched	Commissioned	Shipyard
D'Assas	15 November 1893	1 April 1894	28 March 1896	24 March 1897	Ateliers et Chantiers de la Loire, Saint-Nazaire
Cassard	17 October 1893	22 October 1894	27 May 1896	21 June 1897	Arsenal de Cherbourg, Cherbourg
Du Chayla	18 March 1894	23 March 1894	10 November 1895	15 July 1897	Arsenal de Cherbourg, Cherbourg
G3	Included in the 1894 budget but not ordered, ultimately deferred indefinitely				

== Service history ==
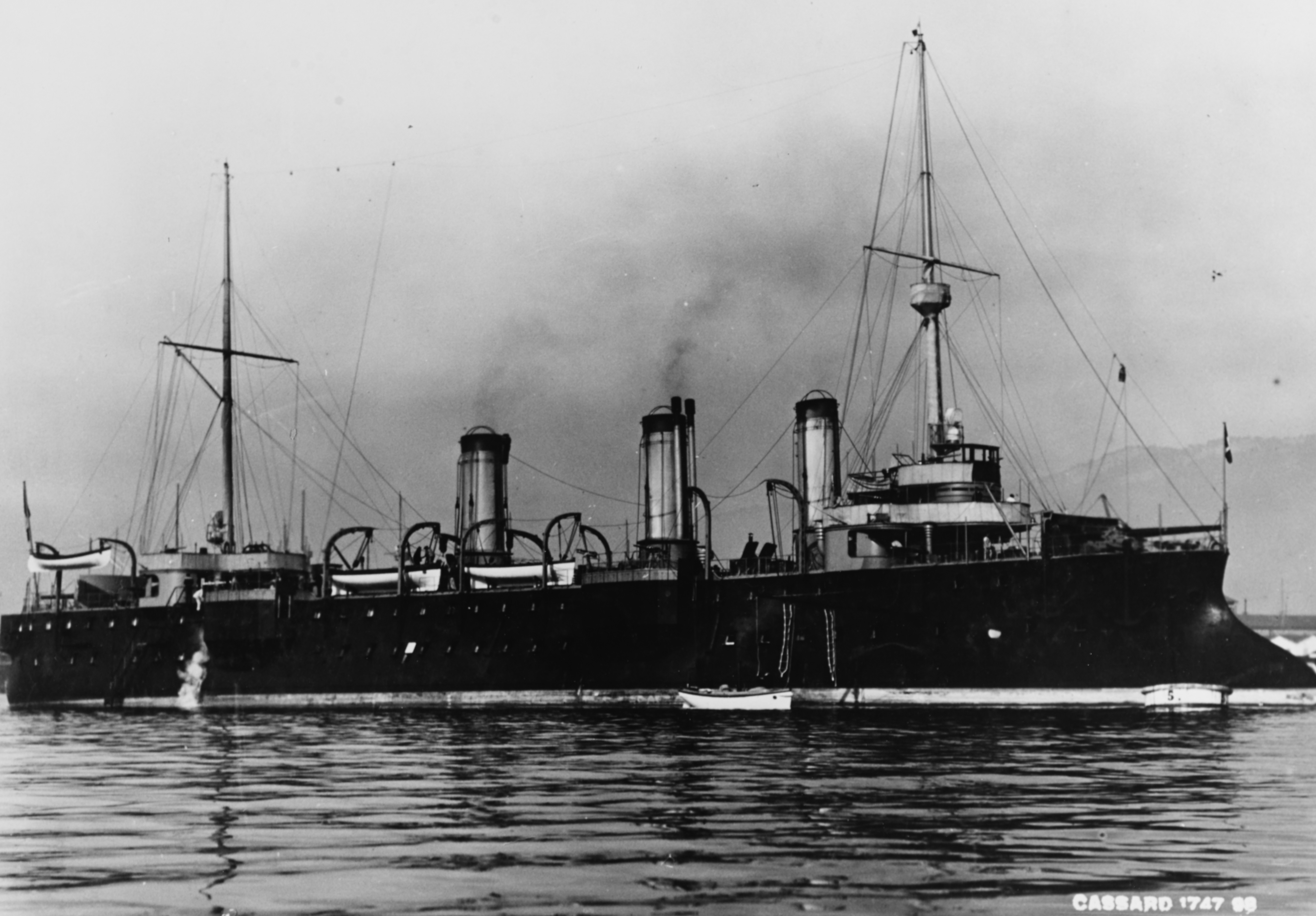
Cassard, date unknown

D'Assas and Cassard initially served with the Mediterranean Squadron after entering service in 1898, and they were joined by Du Chayla the following year. In 1901, D'Assas had been transferred to the Northern Squadron, based in the English Channel. During this period, they were occupied with routine peacetime training exercises with the rest of the main French fleets in home waters. D'Assas was deployed to the cruiser squadron based in French Indochina in East Asia, and in 1905, she assisted with the unsuccessful attempt to re-float the armored cruiser Sully after it ran aground. By that time, Cassard had been reduced to reserve.

In August 1907, Du Chayla supported an amphibious assault in French Morocco during the Bombardment of Casablanca. Cassard was reactivated in 1908 for a deployment to French Morocco. D'Assas returned home that year to be converted into a fast minelayer, along with Cassard, but the project was deemed to be too expensive, and D'Assas was instead placed in reserve and briefly used as a storage hulk for waste oil from 1910 to 1913. D'Assas was struck from the naval register in 1914; she was then sold to ship breakers.

At the start of World War I in August 1914, Cassard initially operated out of Morocco, patrolling for German U-boats. Du Chayla was also assigned to patrol duty in the Atlantic, but she, too, saw no action. In September, Cassard bombarded local villages in Morocco to suppress challenges to French colonial rule. The ship was later transferred to the western Mediterranean and Red Seas, along with a deployment to the Indian Ocean in 1917. By 1918, Du Chayla had been partially disarmed to supply weapons to the French Army. She took part in the Allied intervention in the Russian Civil War in 1919 but was recalled to France in 1920, where she was struck from the naval register in 1921 and sold to ship breakers. In the meantime, Cassard was partially disarmed after World War I and was converted into a gunnery training ship, though she was struck from the register in 1924 and sold for scrap.
