= SMS Friedrich Carl (1902) =

Armored cruiser of the German Imperial Navy

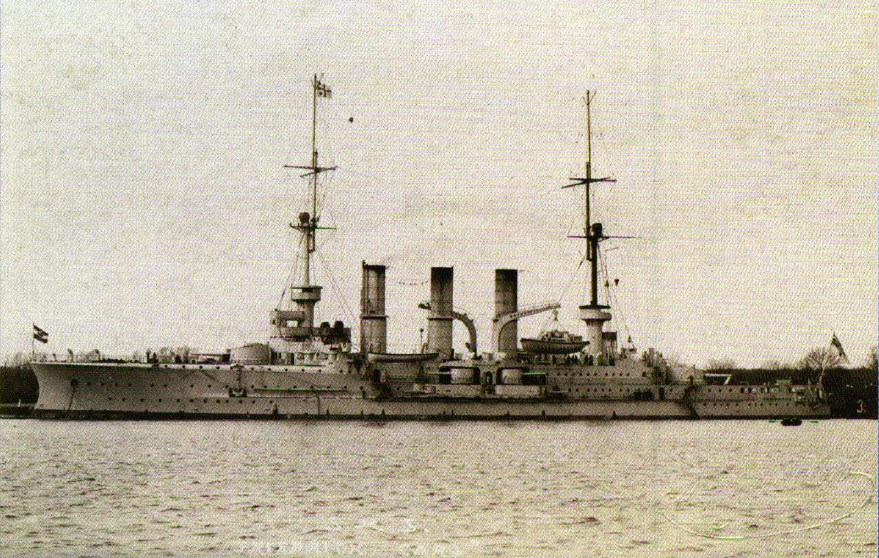
- SMS Friedrich Carl in 1912

History

German Empire
- Name: Friedrich Carl
- Namesake: SMS Friedrich Carl
- Builder: Blohm & Voss, Hamburg
- Laid down: August 1901
- Launched: 21 June 1902
- Commissioned: 12 December 1903
- Fate: Mined and sunk, 17 November 1914

General characteristics
- Class & type: Prinz Adalbert-class cruiser
- Displacement: Normal: 9,087 metric tons (8,943 long tons); Full load: 9,875 t (9,719 long tons)
- Length: 126.5 m (415 ft) o/a
- Beam: 19.6 m (64 ft 4 in)
- Draft: 7.43 m (24 ft 5 in)
- Installed power: 14 × Dürr water-tube boilers; 17,000 PS (17,000 ihp)
- Propulsion: 3 × screw propellers; 3 × triple-expansion steam engines
- Speed: 20 knots (37 km/h; 23 mph)
- Range: 5,080 nautical miles (9,410 km; 5,850 mi) at 12 knots (22 km/h; 14 mph)
- Complement: 35 officers; 551 men
- Armament: 4 × 21 cm (8.3 in) SK L/40 guns; 10 × 15 cm (5.9 in) SK L/40 guns; 12 × 8.8 cm (3.5 in) SK L/35 guns; 4 × 45 cm (17.7 in) torpedo tubes
- Armor: Belt: 100 mm (3.9 in); Turrets: 150 mm (5.9 in); Deck: 40 to 80 mm (1.6 to 3.1 in); Conning tower: 150 mm

SMS Friedrich Carl was a German armored cruiser built in the early 1900s for the German Kaiserliche Marine (Imperial Navy). She was the second and final member of the Prinz Adalbert class, which was built to provide scouts for the German fleet and station ships in Germany's colonial empire. Friedrich Carl was built by the Blohm & Voss shipyard in Hamburg. She was laid down in August 1901, launched in June 1902, and commissioned in December 1903. She was armed with a main battery of four 21 cm (8.3 in) guns and could reach a top speed of 20 knots (37 km/h; 23 mph).

Friedrich Carl served with the scouting forces of the Active Battle Fleet for the first few years of her career, including a stint as the flagship of the reconnaissance squadron. She went on cruises abroad, including voyages escorting Kaiser Wilhelm II on tours in the Mediterranean Sea. She also participated in extensive training exercises in the Baltic and North Seas. In 1909, she was withdrawn from front-line service and used as a torpedo training ship until 1914.

After the outbreak of World War I in July 1914, Friedrich Carl returned to active service for operations in the Baltic Sea against the Imperial Russian Navy. She served as the flagship of the cruiser squadron in the Baltic and participated in patrols in the Gulf of Finland. The ship was modified to carry a pair of seaplanes. In mid-November, the cruiser squadron was tasked with attacking the Russian base at Libau, but while en route on 17 November, Friedrich Carl struck a pair of naval mines. She remained afloat long enough for most of her crew to be taken off by the light cruiser SMS Augsburg before sinking; seven or eight men died as she sank.

== Design ==
Friedrich Carl was the second ship of the Prinz Adalbert class, which was ordered under the Second Naval Law of 1900. The law called for a force of fourteen armored cruisers able to serve in Germany's colonial empire and scout for the main German fleet in home waters. The need for one type of ship to fill both roles was the result of budgetary limitations, which prevented Germany from building vessels specialized to each task. The Prinz Adalbert design was based on the previous armored cruiser, Prinz Heinrich, but it incorporated more powerful armament and more comprehensive armor protection.

=== Characteristics ===
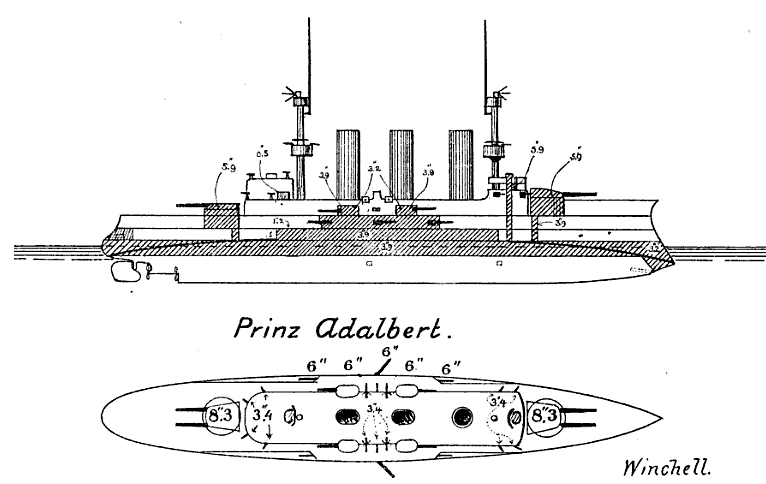
Line-drawing of Prinz Adalbert; the shaded areas represent the portions of the ship protected by armor

The ship was 126.5 m (415 ft) long overall, and had a beam of 19.6 m (64 ft 4 in) and a draft of 7.43 m (24 ft 5 in) forward. She displaced 9,087 t (8,943 long tons; 10,017 short tons) as built and up to 9,875 t (9,719 long tons; 10,885 short tons) fully loaded. She had a raised forecastle deck and a pronounced ram bow. Her superstructure consisted of a small, armored conning tower forward and a larger but unprotected structure further aft that had a small, lightly armored secondary conning position atop it. She was fitted with a pair of short military masts, which stepped down to lighter poles to reduce weight high in the ship. Her standard crew consisted of 35 officers and 551 enlisted men.

Friedrich Carl was powered by three vertical triple expansion engines driving three screws. Steam was generated by fourteen coal-fired water-tube boilers, which were vented through three funnels. Her engines were rated at 17,000 metric horsepower (13,000 kW) to yield a maximum speed of 20 knots (37 km/h; 23 mph), though she slightly exceeded these figures on speed trials. She carried up to 1,630 t (1,600 long tons; 1,800 short tons) of coal that enabled a maximum range of up to 5,080 nautical miles (9,410 km; 5,850 mi) at a cruising speed of 12 kn (22 km/h; 14 mph).

Friedrich Carl was armed with four 21 cm (8.3 in) SK L/40 guns arranged in two twin gun turrets, (Note: In Imperial German Navy gun nomenclature, "SK" (Schnelladekanone) denotes that the gun is quick loading, and the L/40 denotes the length of the gun. In this case, the L/40 gun is 40 calibers, meaning that the gun is 40 times as long as it is in bore diameter.) one on either end of the superstructure. Her secondary armament consisted of ten 15 cm (5.9 in) guns, which were mounted individually in four single-gun turrets and six casemates. These were clustered amidships, with two turrets and three casemates per broadside. For defense against torpedo boats, she carried a battery of twelve 8.8 cm (3.5 in) guns, also in individual mounts. She was also equipped with four 45 cm (17.7 in) underwater torpedo tubes, one in the bow, one in the stern, and one on each broadside.

The ship was protected by Krupp armor; her armored belt was 100 mm (3.9 in) thick amidships and reduced to 80 mm (3.1 in) forward and aft. The deck armor was 40 to 80 mm (1.6 to 3.1 in) thick, and on her forward conning tower the plating was 150 mm (5.9 in) thick. The main battery turrets had 150 mm thick sides and the casemate guns were protected with 100 mm of Krupp steel.

== Service history ==
=== Construction through 1905 ===
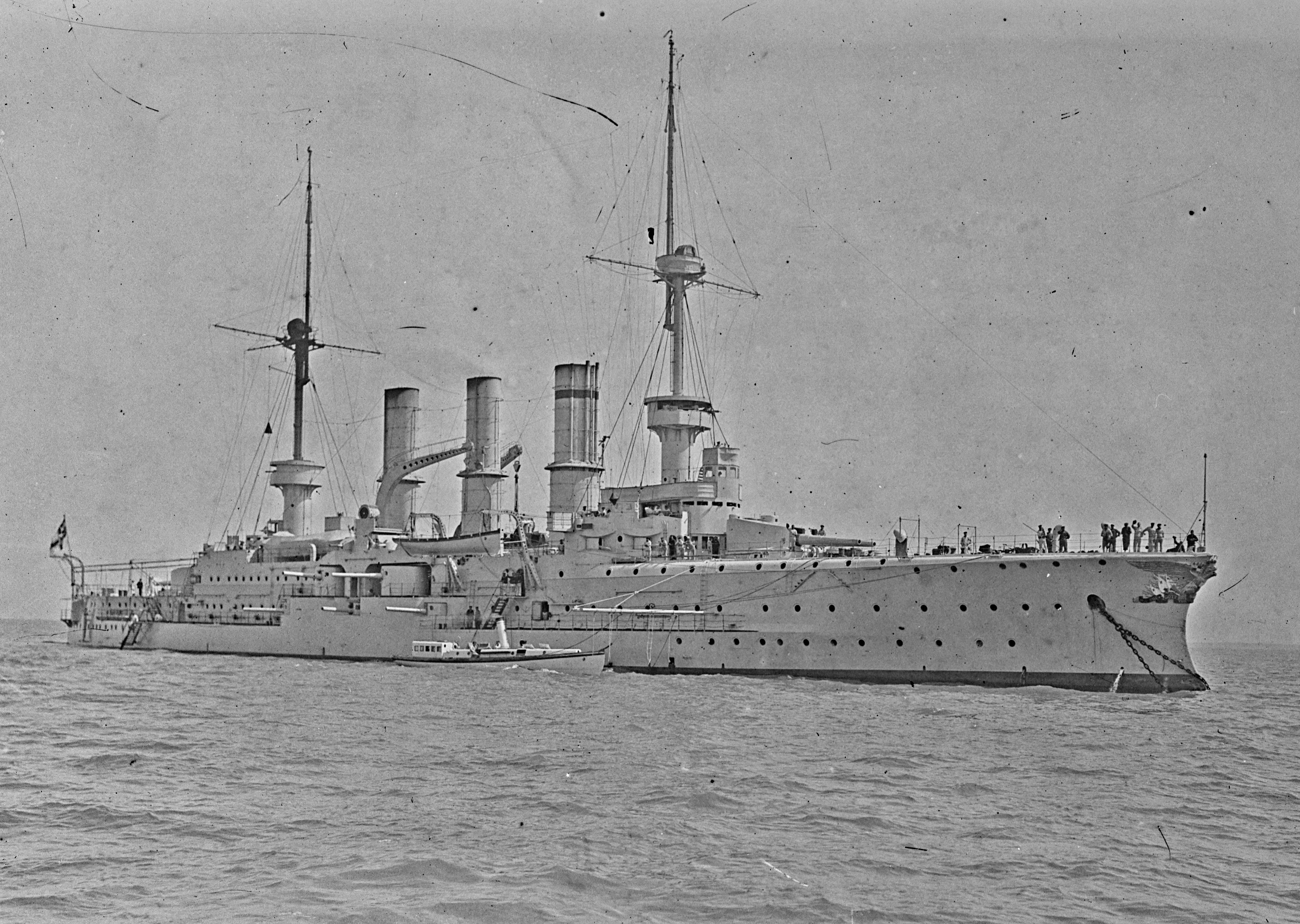
Friedrich Carl early in her career

Friedrich Carl was ordered under the provisional name Ersatz König Wilhelm and built at the Blohm & Voss shipyard in Hamburg under yard number 155. (Note: German warships were ordered under provisional names. For new additions to the fleet, they were given a single letter; for those ships intended to replace older or lost vessels, they were ordered as "Ersatz (name of the ship to be replaced)".) Her keel was laid down in August 1901 and she was launched on 21 June 1902, being named after the earlier ironclad SMS Friedrich Carl. At the launching ceremony, Prince Friedrich Leopold of Prussia gave a speech; he was the son of Prince Friedrich Carl of Prussia, an army commander of the mid-19th century and namesake of the earlier ship. Friedrich Leopold's wife, Louise Sophie, christened the ship. Fitting-out work followed, and on 20 October 1903 a shipyard crew began builder's trials before she was moved to first to Cuxhaven and then to Wilhelmshaven on 24 October. In the latter port, she had her artillery installed. Work on the vessel was completed by 12 December 1903, the day she was commissioned to begin sea trials; her first commander was Kapitän zur See (KzS—Captain at Sea) Johannes Merten. Initial testing was normally carried out in the Baltic, from the naval base at Kiel, but the shipyard there was already busy conducting trials for her sister ship Prinz Adalbert and teh light cruiser Undine, among other projects, and so Friedrich Carl remained in the North Sea. During testing in late December, a number of ball bearings in the ship's engines began to overheat; the problem was eventually resolved with a new type of lubricating oil.

The trials were interrupted in March 1904 when Friedrich Carl was tasked with escorting Kaiser Wilhelm II aboard the Norddeutscher Lloyd steamer SS König Albert on a trip to the Mediterranean Sea. On 12 March the ships left Bremerhaven and steamed to Vigo, Spain, where the Spanish king, Alfonso XIII, visited Friedrich Carl on 15 March. Three days later the ships arrived in Gibraltar, where they met the British Channel Squadron. They then proceeded to Naples, Italy, by way of Mahón, where on 24 March Wilhelm II transferred to his yacht, Hohenzollern. King Victor Emmanuel III of Italy visited Friedrich Carl at Mahón before she, Hohenzollern, and the dispatch boat Sleipner began a tour of Mediterranean ports. Friedrich Carl was in need of repairs, so she left Hohenzollern and Sleipner on 26 April and began the voyage back to Germany; she stopped in Venice, Italy, on 7 May and arrived back in Kiel on 17 May. There, she was assigned to the reconnaissance force of the Active Battle Fleet, taking the place of the protected cruiser Victoria Louise.

Beginning in June 1904, Friedrich Carl joined II Squadron for a tour of Dutch, British, and Norwegian ports that lasted until August. During the voyage, Friedrich Carl had to tow two torpedo boats in company with the coastal defense ship Odin and the torpedo boat S98 to Stavanger, Norway. On returning to Germany, the German fleet conducted its annual maneuvers in August and September in the North and Baltic Seas. Following the conclusion of the maneuvers in September, Merten was replaced as the ship's commander by Fregattenkapitän (FK—Frigate Captain) Hugo von Cotzhausen. The ship's sea trials were also officially ended at this point. In November, the crew briefly staged a mutiny against Cotzhausen, citing his inept leadership, though he remained in command. Konteradmiral (KAdm—Rear Admiral) Gustav Schmidt, who was the commander of reconnaissance forces of the Active Battlefleet, transferred from Prinz Heinrich, making Friedrich Carl the new flagship of the reconnaissance squadron.

=== 1905–1914 ===
From January to February 1905, Friedrich Carl participated in training exercises in the Baltic. While cruising north of the Great Belt, she struck a submerged shipwreck but suffered no significant damage. Beginning on 23 March, she again accompanied Wilhelm II, who was aboard the HAPAG steamship SS Hamburg, for another voyage to the Mediterranean. While the ships were in Lisbon, they were visited by King Carlos I of Portugal. The German Chancellor, Bernhard von Bülow, sent a message to Wilhelm II in Lisbon suggesting he visit Morocco, and on 31 March Friedrich Carl and Hamburg arrived in Tangier, where they met the French cruisers Du Chayla and Linois. Wilhelm II made a speech supporting Moroccan independence, which led to the First Moroccan Crisis. The following day, the two German vessels steamed to Gibraltar, where Friedrich Carl accidentally collided with the British pre-dreadnought battleship HMS Prince George. It is not known if either ship suffered any damage. During the cruise, Schmidt transferred to Prinz Heinrich. On her return to Germany in June, Friedrich Carl resumed her role as flagship, apart from during a maintenance period from 10 to 26 August.

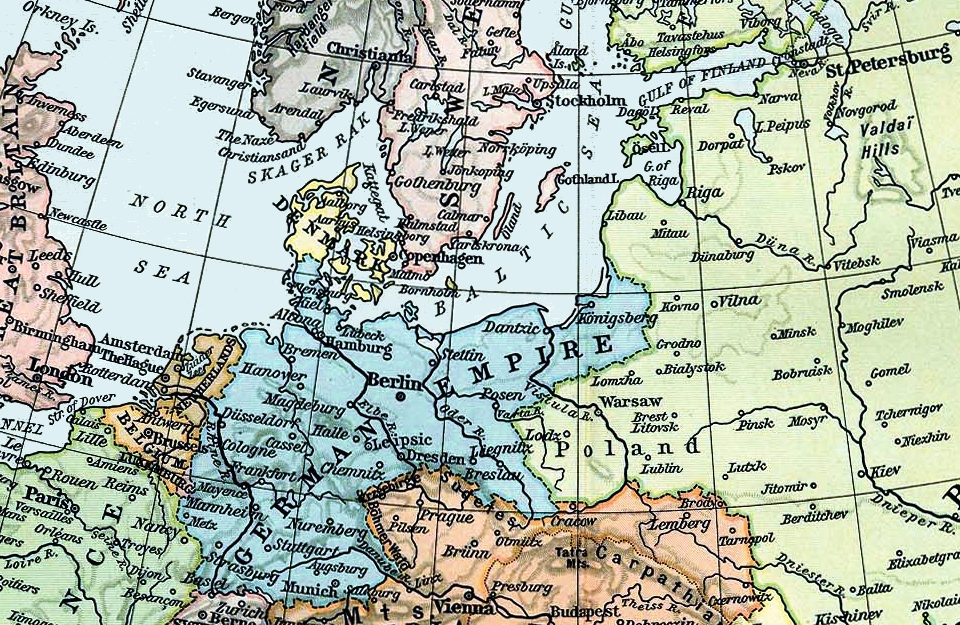
Map of the North and Baltic Seas in 1911

In July, Friedrich Carl joined the rest of the fleet for a cruise in the North and Baltic Seas, during which she ran aground but was not damaged. She then participated in squadron exercises in the Baltic. In February 1906, she went on a training cruise to Denmark. The new armored cruiser Yorck replaced Friedrich Carl as the squadron flagship in late March. Friedrich Carl in turn replaced Prinz Heinrich as the flagship of the deputy commander, Kommodore (Commodore) Raimund Winkler. She remained in this role until the new armored cruiser Roon took her place on 15 August. The autumn maneuvers of 1906 were conducted in Norwegian waters and the western Baltic. After the maneuvers, FK Franz Hipper took command of the ship. Friedrich Carl resumed her role as the deputy commander flagship on 31 October when KzS Eugen Kalau vom Hofe came aboard the ship; she held the position until 5 March 1908. The year 1907 passed uneventfully for Friedrich Carl; she briefly served as the squadron flagship from 11 September to 28 October after Yorck suffered an accident. Friedrich Carl went on a major training cruise into the Atlantic Ocean in early 1908 and on her return to Wilhelmshaven was decommissioned on 5 March for lengthy repairs.

On returning to service on 1 March 1909, KzS Friedrich Schultz assumed command of the ship, which was to be used as a torpedo test ship. In this role, she replaced the protected cruiser SMS Vineta; Schultz was also the commander of the Torpedo Testing Inspectorate. On 30 March, Friedrich Carl was assigned to the temporary Training and Testing Ship Unit for maneuvers off the island of Rügen in April. The unit was dissolved on 24 April, and from mid-August to early September, Friedrich Carl participated in the autumn maneuvers as part of the Reconnaissance Group of the Reserve Fleet. The years 1910 and 1911 followed a similar training routine to that of 1909, and Schultz had been replaced by KzS Ernst Ritter von Mann und Edler von Tiechler as the ship's captain in September 1909 and by KAdm Wilhelm von Lans as commander of the Torpedo Testing Inspectorate on 19 December 1909. Tiechler was in turn replaced by FK Andreas Michelsen in September 1911; he held the command until the outbreak of World War I in July 1914.

In July 1911, Friedrich Carl conducted torpedo tests with the light cruiser Augsburg in Norwegian waters. The winter of 1911–1912 was particularly severe, and in early 1912 Friedrich Carl was used to rescue merchant ships that had been trapped in the iced-over Baltic. That year, the Training and Testing Ship Unit was reactivated as the Training Squadron for exercises. KAdm Reinhard Koch replaced Lans on 1 October 1912 and kept Friedrich Carl as his flagship. During the autumn maneuvers that year, Friedrich Carl was assigned to II Scouting Group of what was now the High Seas Fleet. The training routine in 1913 and the first half of 1914 followed the same pattern as in previous years. On 6 April 1914, she ran aground off Swinemünde but was pulled free without damage. During the Kiel Week sailing regatta in July 1914, Großadmiral (Grand Admiral) Alfred von Tirpitz came aboard Friedrich Carl to observe the festivities, which coincided with a visit from the British 2nd Battle Squadron. During the visit, British ambassador Edward Goschen visited Tirpitz aboard the ship, when news of the assassination of Archduke Franz Ferdinand arrived. On 31 July, days after Austria-Hungary declared war on Serbia but before Germany entered the war, Friedrich Carl went into drydock at the Kaiserliche Werft (Imperial Shipyard) in Kiel for repairs in preparation for the coming conflict. The overhaul had already been scheduled, but it was allowed to proceed since her crew could be used for more urgently needed activities.

=== World War I ===
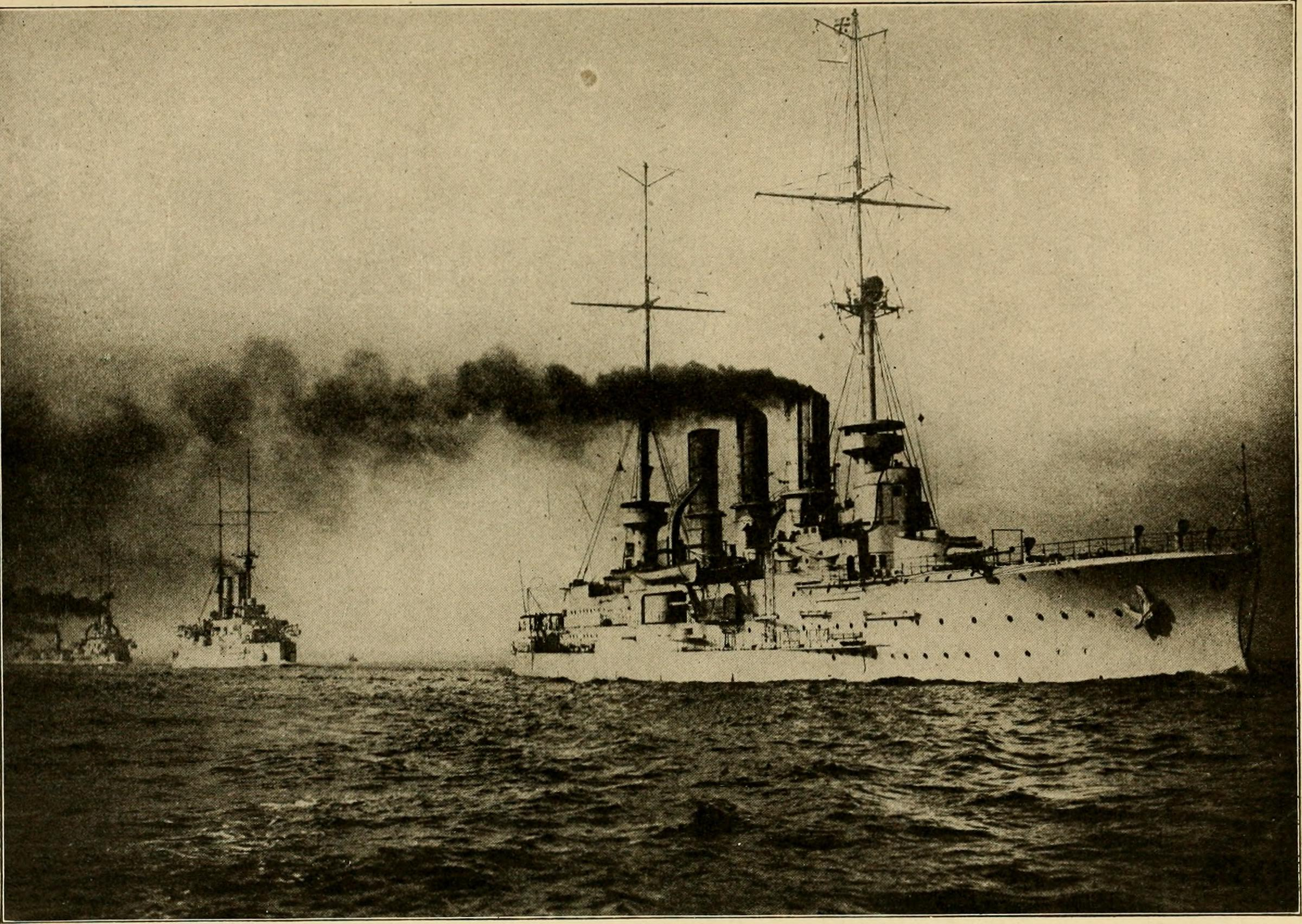
SMS Friedrich Carl leading a line of ships in 1914

On 28 August 1914, Friedrich Carl returned to service under the command of KzS Max Schlicht; he held the position for just two months before being replaced by FK Loesch. Friedrich Carl was assigned to the Cruiser Division of the Baltic Sea, taking the place of the protected cruiser Freya (which had provided the bulk of the crew used to man Friedrich Karl) and becoming the flagship of KAdm Robert Mischke. The ship still needed significant work to ready her for combat operations, and it was not until 10 September that she was ready to take her first trial cruise. Working up continued for more than a month, and on 15 October, the ship was deemed ready for active service; she sailed that day to join the rest of the division in the eastern Baltic. The ship became the flagship of KAdm Ehler Behring, the commander of the cruiser division. At the time, the unit included the protected cruisers Vineta, Hertha, and Hansa and the light cruisers Augsburg, Thetis, and Lübeck, along with attendant torpedo boats and U-boats. The division was based in Neufahrwasser in Danzig.

Friedrich Carl took part in a sortie into the Gulf of Finland on 24 October to sweep for Russian warships and British submarines that were operating in the area, though the Germans failed to locate any hostile vessels. By this time, the ship had been modified to carry seaplanes; she carried two planes provisionally and had no permanent modifications made to support them. These were an unspecified Albatros scout plane and a Rumpler 4B2. Neither aircraft was used during the sortie, in part because of poor weather. On 30 October another patrol was carried out, again without success. In early November, Friedrich Carl was withdrawn for repairs, which were completed at Danzig by 16 November. At that time, the ship's Rumpler was sent ashore, leaving only an Albatross WDD floatplane aboard.

In the meantime, the German naval command, which was aware that British submarines were operating in the Baltic Sea, had ordered Behring to attack the Russian port at Libau to prevent it being used as a British submarine base. Friedrich Carl was assigned to the attack force, and she left Memel on 16 November to bombard Russian positions around Libau. At 01:46 on 17 November, while 33 nautical miles (61 km; 38 mi) west of Memel, she struck a naval mine that had been laid by Russian destroyers in October. The ship's crew initially thought the shock of the explosion was from striking a submarine; Loesch immediately altered course to return to Memel, at which point she struck a second mine at 01:57. She began to take on water, though she remained afloat for some time. The engine for the ship's rudder failed about twenty minutes after the second mine detonation, leaving the rudder stuck at 20 degrees to port. Her main engines were stopped to preserve as much steam for her pumps as possible, but they could not keep up with the ingress of water. At about 06:00, Augsburg arrived on the scene and evacuated the crew, who were ordered to abandon ship at 06:20. Friedrich Carl was left to sink, and by 07:00, her list had increased dangerously. She abruptly capsized at 07:15 and sank. Seven or eight men died in the sinking.
