= French cruiser Linois (1894) =

Protected cruiser of the French Navy

- Linois sometime before 1896

History

France
- Name: Linois
- Builder: Société Nouvelle des Forges et Chantiers de la Méditerranée
- Laid down: August 1892
- Launched: 30 January 1894
- Completed: 1895
- Stricken: 1910
- Fate: Broken up

General characteristics
- Class & type: Linois-class cruiser
- Displacement: 2,285 to 2,318 long tons (2,322 to 2,355 t)
- Length: 98 m (321 ft 6 in) loa
- Beam: 10.62 m (34 ft 10 in)
- Draft: 5.44 m (17 ft 10 in)
- Installed power: 6 × fire-tube boilers; 6,800 indicated horsepower (5,100 kW)
- Propulsion: 2 × triple-expansion steam engines; 2 × screw propellers
- Speed: 20.5 knots (38.0 km/h; 23.6 mph)
- Range: 3,000 nmi (5,600 km; 3,500 mi) at 10 knots (19 km/h; 12 mph)
- Complement: 250–269
- Armament: 4 × 138.6 mm (5.5 in) guns; 2 × 100 mm (3.9 in) guns; 8 × 47 mm (1.9 in) guns; 2 × 37 mm (1.5 in) guns; 4 × 37 mm Hotchkiss revolver cannon; 4 × 450 mm (17.7 in) torpedo tubes
- Armor: Deck: 40 mm (1.6 in); Conning tower: 138 mm (5 in)

Linois was the lead ship of her class of protected cruisers built for the French Navy in the 1890s. The class was ordered as part of a construction program directed at strengthening the fleet's cruiser force. At the time, France was concerned with the growing naval threat of the Italian and German fleets, and the new cruisers were intended to serve with the main fleet, and overseas in the French colonial empire. Linois was armed with a main battery of four 138.6 mm (5.5 in) guns, was protected by an armored deck 40 mm (1.6 in) thick, and had a top speed of 20.5 knots (38.0 km/h; 23.6 mph).

Linois was completed in 1895 and joined the Mediterranean Squadron the next year, serving as part of the cruiser force of the main French battle fleet. She took part in training exercises during this period, which sometimes included joint maneuvers with the Northern Squadron. The ship was involved in a show of force meant to intimidate the Ottoman Empire in 1902 during a period of tension with France. Linois remained in service with the squadron until 1905, and was struck from the naval register in 1910 and broken up for scrap.

== Design ==
Plan and profile drawing of the Linois class

In response to a war scare with Italy in the late 1880s, the French Navy embarked on a major construction program in 1890 to counter the threat of the fleets of Italy and its ally Germany. The plan called for a total of seventy cruisers for use in home waters and overseas in the French colonial empire. The Linois class was ordered as part of the program, and the design was based on the earlier Forbin class.

Linois was 98 m (321 ft 6 in) long overall, with a beam of 10.62 m (34 ft 10 in) and a draft of 5.44 m (17 ft 10 in). She displaced 2,285 to 2,318 long tons (2,322 to 2,355 t). Her crew varied over the course of her career, amounting to 250–269 officers and enlisted men. The ship's propulsion system consisted of a pair of triple-expansion steam engines driving two screw propellers. Steam was provided by six coal-burning fire-tube boilers that were ducted into two funnels. Her machinery was rated to produce 6,800 indicated horsepower (5,100 kW) for a top speed of 20.5 knots (38.0 km/h; 23.6 mph). She had a cruising radius of 3,000 nautical miles (5,600 km; 3,500 mi) at 10 knots (19 km/h; 12 mph) and 600 nmi (1,100 km; 690 mi) at 20.5 knots.

The ship was armed with a main battery of four 138.6 mm (5.5 in) 45-caliber guns in individual pivot mounts, all in sponsons located amidships with two guns per broadside. These were supported by a secondary battery that consisted of a pair of 100 mm (3.9 in) guns, one at the bow and the other at the stern. For close-range defense against torpedo boats, she carried eight 47 mm (1.9 in) 3-pounder Hotchkiss guns, two 37 mm (1.5 in) guns, and four 37 mm Hotchkiss revolver cannon. She was also armed with four 450 mm (17.7 in) torpedo tubes in her hull above the waterline, and she could carry up to 120 naval mines. Armor protection consisted of a curved armor deck 40 mm (1.6 in) thick, and 138 mm (5 in) plating on the conning tower.

== Service history ==
Linois early in her career, before 1898

Linois was built at the Société Nouvelle des Forges et Chantiers de la Méditerranée shipyard in La Seyne-sur-Mer. She was laid down in August 1892, the first member of her class to begin construction. She was launched on 30 January 1894, and completed in 1895. The ship conducted her sea trials later that year, including tests in July and August. Linois was assigned to the Mediterranean Squadron in 1896, serving in the cruiser force for the main French fleet, along with three armored cruisers, three protected cruisers, and four torpedo cruisers. The maneuvers for that year took place from 6 to 30 July. She remained with the unit through 1897. By 1899, the unit had been strengthened with new ships, allowing older, less effective vessels to be sent elsewhere. By that time, the unit consisted of six pre-dreadnought battleships, three armored cruisers, seven other protected cruisers, and several smaller vessels in addition to Linois. The unit remained largely unchanged in 1900, apart from the reduction in the number of protected cruisers to five, including Linois.

She operated with the Mediterranean Squadron in 1901. That year, the annual fleet maneuvers were conducted from 3 to 28 July. During the exercises, the Northern Squadron steamed south for joint maneuvers with the Mediterranean Squadron. The Northern Squadron ships formed part of the hostile force, and as it was entering the Mediterranean from the Atlantic, represented a German squadron attempting to meet its Italian allies. On 30 October, Linois joined elements of the Mediterranean Squadron to conduct what were purported to be tests with wireless telegraphy, but was in fact a show of force in the Aegean Sea to intimidate the Ottoman Empire. Relations between the two were poor at the time. On 6 November, two of the battleships and several cruisers, including Linois, were detached to sail east for the operation. The cruisers proceeded independently from the battleships and met them at Mytilene on the island of Lesbos. The ships then re-formed and arrived back in Toulon on 9 December.

One of the Linois-class cruisers before 1905

The ship continued to serve in the squadron through 1902. During the 1902 fleet maneuvers, which began on 7 July, the Northern Squadron attempted to force a passage through the Strait of Gibraltar. The cruisers of the Mediterranean Squadron, including Linois, conducted patrols from their base at Mers El Kébir to observe their entrance and signal the rest of the fleet. After successfully detecting the simulated enemy squadron, they shadowed the vessels until the rest of the Mediterranean Squadron assembled, but the Northern Squadron commander was able to shake his pursuers long enough to prevent them from intercepting his force before the end of the exercises on 15 July. Further maneuvers with the combined fleet took place, concluding on 5 August. The ship remained in service with the squadron through 1905. In March 1905, in late March, she and the cruiser Du Chayla were present in Tangier during a visit by the German armored cruiser Friedrich Carl and the passenger steamer SS Hamburg, carrying German Kaiser Wilhelm II. The visit precipitated the First Moroccan Crisis between France and Germany. She was struck from the naval register in 1910 and sold to ship breakers for disposal.
