= French destroyer Magon =

Destroyer of the French Navy

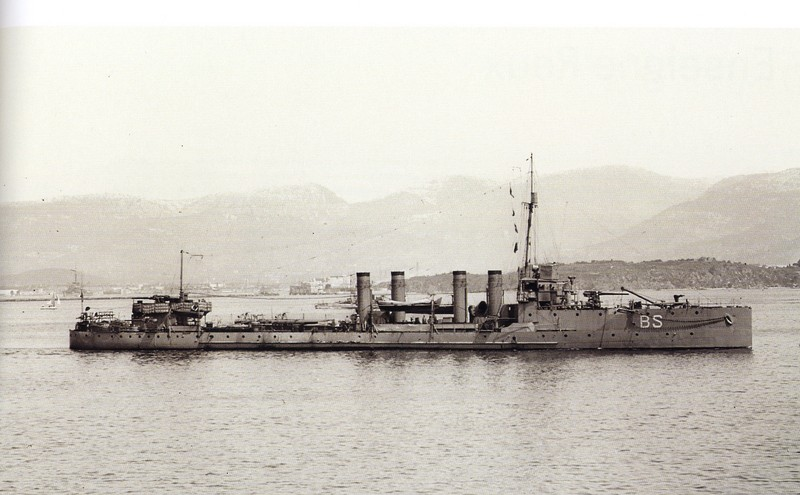
- Sister ship Bisson in harbor

History

France
- Name: Magon
- Builder: Ateliers et Chantiers de Bretagne, Nantes
- Laid down: 1911
- Launched: 19 April 1913
- Completed: 1914
- Stricken: 16 February 1926

General characteristics
- Class & type: Bisson-class destroyer
- Displacement: 756–791 t (744–779 long tons)
- Length: 78.1 m (256 ft 3 in) (p/p)
- Beam: 8.6 m (28 ft 3 in)
- Draft: 3.1 m (10 ft 2 in)
- Installed power: 15,000 shp (11,185 kW); 4 water-tube boilers
- Propulsion: 2 shafts; 2 steam turbines
- Speed: 30 knots (56 km/h; 35 mph)
- Range: 1,950 nmi (3,610 km; 2,240 mi) at 14 knots (26 km/h; 16 mph)
- Complement: 80–83
- Armament: 2 × single 100 mm (3.9 in) guns; 4 × single 65 mm (2.6 in) guns; 2 × twin 450 mm (17.7 in) torpedo tubes

Magon was one of six Bisson-class destroyers built for the French Navy during the 1910s.

== Construction and design ==
Magon was laid down at the Nantes shipyard of Ateliers et Chantiers de Bretagne in 1911 as one of six Bisson-class destroyers ordered for the French Navy under the 1910 and 1911 construction programmes as a follow-on to the earlier Bouclier-class "800-tonne" destroyers. She was launched on 19 April 1913 and was completed in 1914.

Magon was larger than the other ships of the class, being 83.0 metres (272 ft 4 in) long, with a beam of 8.23 metres (27 ft 0 in) and a draught of 3.05 metres (10 ft 0 in). Displacement was 844 t (831 long tons). The machinery powering the ships differed in detail between the ships of the class. Magon was fitted with four Indret boilers which fed steam to two set of Rateau steam turbines, with the machinery rated at 15,000 shaft horsepower (11,000 kW), giving a design speed of 30 knots (56 km/h; 35 mph). Four funnels were fitted. Magon reached a speed of 32.02 knots (59.30 km/h; 36.85 mph) during sea trials, and was the fastest of her class, although operational sea speeds were lower.

Armament consisted of two 100 mm (3.9 in) Modèle 1893 guns, four 65 mm (2.6 in) Modèle 1902 guns and four 450 mm (17.7 in) torpedo tubes in two twin mounts. This was modified during the First World War by the addition of a 47 mm or 75 mm anti-aircraft gun, two machineguns and provision for up to ten depth charges. The ship had a crew of 5–7 officers and 75–77 other ranks.

== Service ==
=== First World War ===
==== Mediterranean ====
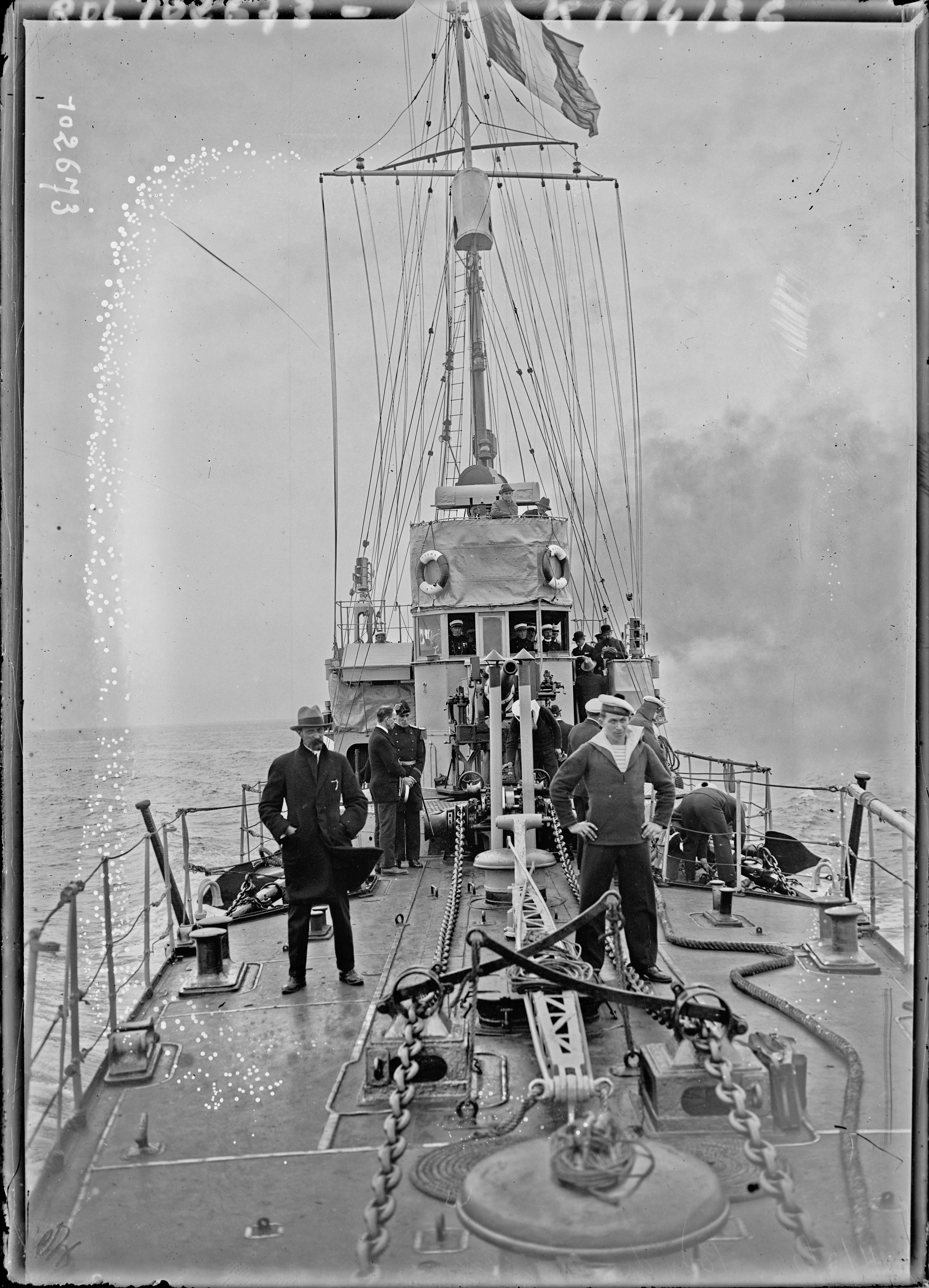
Deck and bridge of Magon, 1925

When the First World War began in August 1914, Magon was assigned to the 6th Destroyer Flotilla (6^{e} escadrille de torpilleurs) of the 1st Naval Army (^{1ère} Armée Navale). During the preliminary stages of the Battle of Antivari on 16 August, the 1st, 4th and 5th Destroyer Flotillas were tasked to escort the core of the 1st Naval Army while the 2nd, 3rd and 6th Flotillas escorted the armored cruisers of the 2nd Light Squadron (2^{e} escadre légère) and two British cruisers. After reuniting both groups and spotting the Austro-Hungarian protected cruiser SMS Zenta and the destroyer SMS Ulan, the French destroyers played no role in sinking the cruiser, although the 4th Flotilla was sent on an unsuccessful pursuit of Ulan.

The torpedoing of the French battleship Jean Bart on 21 December caused a change in French tactics as the battleships were too important to risk to submarine attack. Henceforth, only the destroyers would escort the transports, covered by cruisers at a distance of 20–50 miles (32–80 km) from the transports. The first convoy of 1915 to Antivari arrived on 11 January and more were made until the last one on 20–21 April. After Italy signed the Treaty of London and declared war on the Austro-Hungarian Empire on 23 May, the ship was still assigned to the 6th Flotilla when the unit was transferred to the 1st Division of Destroyers and Submarines (1^{ère} division de torpilleurs et de sous-marines) of the 2nd Squadron (escadre) based at Brindisi, Italy. She was deployed on patrols aimed at stopping Austro-Hungarian surface ships and submarines from passing through the Straits of Otranto. On 8 June, Magon was part of the escort (consisting of four Italian and three French destroyers) for the British light cruiser Dublin on a patrol off the Albanian coast intended to destroy Austro-Hungarian light naval forces. Despite the strong escort, the Austro-Hungarian submarine U-4 managed to torpedo Dublin, killing 13 of the British cruiser's crew, but the escort managed to drive away several more suspected submarine attacks, and Dublin successfully reached Brindisi without further damage.

On 12 July, the 6th Destroyer Flotilla, including Magon, was part of the force that raided the island of Lastovo off the Austrian coast of the Adriatic (now part of Croatia), destroying oil stores and the telegraph station. This attack was simultaneous with the Italian occupation of Palagruža. She remained based at Brindisi in September 1915, but on 6 December was recorded as being at Nantes.

==== Dunkirk flotilla ====
From December 1916 Magon served in the Dunkirk flotilla, operating in the English Channel and Dover Straits. On the night of 24/25 April 1917, Magon and the destroyer Bouclier were patrolling off Gravelines, with the destroyer Étendard deployed to the east of Dunkirk and three small torpedo boats to the north when four German small A-class torpedo boats attacked Dunkirk, shelling the port. The German force encountered Étendard on its return journey and sank the French destroyer with torpedoes, and then badly damaged the French trawler Notre Dame des Lourdes in an exchange of gunfire. On the night of 19/20 May 1917, Magon, together with the destroyers Bouclier, Capitaine Mehl and Enseigne Roux clashed with five A-class torpedo boats. This clash, when the French ships heavily outgunned the German torpedo boats, resulted in offensive operations by the German A-class torpedo boats out of Flanders being suspended. On 27 October, Magon, with the French destroyers Capitaine Mehl and Francis Garnier and the British destroyers Botha and Mentor, clashed with the German large torpedo boats S54, S55 and G91. Magon received light damage.

On the night of 20/21 March 1918, Magon, Bouclier, Capitaine Mehl and the British destroyers Botha and Morris were on standby at Dunkirk, when 19 German torpedo boats carried out an operation to bombard the coastal railway running between Dunkirk and Nieuport, in support of the German spring offensive. The Dunkirk-based destroyers sortied in response, and intercepted one group of 7 small torpedo boats. Botha rammed and sank one of the German torpedo boats, A19, and damaged a second, A7, but was then torpedoed by Capitaine Mehl, whose commanding officer had mistaken Botha for a German ship in the confusion of the night action. The French destroyers then sank A7 with gunfire and then escorted Botha as the damaged British destroyer was towed to safety by Morris. On 14 October 1918, Magon, together with Enseigne Roux and Mécanicien Principal Lestin, accompanied British monitors as they bombarded German positions on the Flanders coast.

In November 1918, Magon and Enseigne Henry accompanied the cruiser Amiral Aube to Rosyth to attend the surrender of the German High Seas Fleet following the Armistice that ended the First World War.

=== Fate ===
Magon was stricken on 16 February 1926.

== Bibliography ==
- Couhat, Jean Labayle (1974). French Warships of World War I. London: Ian Allan. ISBN 0-7110-0445-5.
- Fock, Harald (1981). Schwarze Gesellen: Band 2: Zerstörer bis 1914 (in German). Herford, Germany: Koehlers Verlagsgesellschaft mBH. ISBN 3-7822-0206-6.
- Fock, Harald (1989). Z-Vor! Internationale Entwicklung und Kriegseinsätze von Zerstörern und Torpedobooten 1914 bis 1939 (in German). Herford, Germany: Koehlers Verlagsgesellschaft mBH. ISBN 3-7822-0207-4.
- Freivogel, Zvonimir (2019). The Great War in the Adriatic Sea 1914–1918. Zagreb: Despot Infinitus. ISBN 978-953-8218-40-8.
- Gardiner, Robert & Gray, Randal (1985). Conway's All The World's Fighting Ships 1906–1921. London: Conway Maritime Press. ISBN 0-85177-245-5.
- Goldrick, James (2018). After Jutland: The Naval War in Northern Waters, June 1916–November 1918. Barnsley, UK: Seaforth Publishing. ISBN 978-1-5267-4298-8.
- Halpern, Paul G. (1994). A Naval History of World War I. London: UCL Press. ISBN 1-85728-498-4.
- Karau, Mark K. (2014). The Naval Flank of the Western Front: The German MarineKorps Flandern 1914–1918. Barnsley, UK: Seaforth Publishing. ISBN 978-1-84832-231-8.
- Monograph No. 21: The Mediterranean 1914–1915 (PDF). Naval Staff Monographs (Historical). Vol. VIII. The Naval Staff, Training and Staff Duties Division. 1923.
- Newbolt, Henry (1928). History of the Great War: Naval Operations: Volume IV. London: Longmans, Green & Co.
- Newbolt, Henry (1931). History of the Great War: Naval Operations: Volume V. London: Longmans, Green & Co.
- Prévoteaux, Gérard (2017). La marine française dans la Grande guerre: les combattants oubliés: Tome I 1914–1915 [The French Navy during the Great War: The Forgotten Combatants, Book I 1914–1915]. Collection Navires & Histoire des Marines du Mond. Vol. 23. Le Vigen, France: Éditions Lela presse. ISBN 978-2-37468-000-2.
- Prévoteaux, Gérard (2017). La marine française dans la Grande guerre: les combattants oubliés: Tome II 1916–1918 [The French Navy during the Great War: The Forgotten Combatants, Book II 1916–1918]. Collection Navires & Histoire des Marines du Mond. Vol. 27. Le Vigen, France: Éditions Lela presse. ISBN 978-2-37468-001-9.
- Roberts, Stephen S. (2021). French Warships in the Age of Steam 1859–1914: Design, Construction, Careers and Fates. Barnsley, UK: Seaforth Publishing. ISBN 978-1-5267-4533-0.
