= Lion-class destroyer =

Class overview
- Name: Lion class
- Operators: French Navy
- Preceded by: Arabe class
- Succeeded by: Enseigne Gabolde
- Planned: 2
- Completed: 0
- Canceled: 2

General characteristics
- Type: Destroyer
- Displacement: 1,780 tons (standard); 2,063 t (full load)
- Length: 107 m (351.0 ft) oa
- Beam: 10.5 m (34.4 ft)
- Draught: 4 m (13.1 ft)
- Installed power: 4 oil-fired du Temple boilers; 38,000 shp (28,000 kW)
- Propulsion: 2-shaft Parsons geared turbines
- Speed: 35.5 knots (65.7 km/h; 40.9 mph)
- Range: 3,000 nautical miles (5,600 km; 3,500 mi) at 17 knots (31 km/h; 20 mph)
- Complement: 7 officers, 171 sailors
- Armament: 5 × 100 mm (3.9 in)/45 guns (5 × 1); 2 × 75 mm (3.0 in)/50 guns (2 × 1); 6 × 550 mm (22 in) torpedo tubes (2 × 3)

The Lion class were a planned series of destroyers (contre-torpilleur) for the French Navy (Marine Nationale). The class of two ships were to be a continuation of the M89 class project which began in 1913 but were not built due to the outbreak of World War I. While approved by the Naval Ministry for construction, funding for the design was rejected by the French Parliament in 1920. While never built, the two ships of the class were to be named Lion and Guépard. The names were later reused later by two ships of the Guépard class.

== Design and development ==
Beginning with the 30 March 1912 promulgation of the Statut Naval (Naval Law), France began developing new doctrines and designs for their destroyer fleet. The Naval Law stipulated that France should build fifty-eight new flotilla craft, for a total of one-hundred fifteen torpilleur d'escadre (fleet torpedo boats) by the year 1920. This initially led to the order of two M89-class destroyers originally planned for 1915 but neither would be laid down to the start of World War I. In the interim France ordered twelve Arabe class from the Empire of Japan, and seized four nearly completed destroyers under construction in France. These seized ships became the Aventurier class and were originally ordered for the Argentine Navy. While construction of the M89 class never proceeded, work on the project continued into the immediate interwar period.

Work on the torpilleur d'escadre project had already resumed in 1917 but, by the end of the war, revisions had become necessary. Advances in military technology and the development of new fleet doctrines meant the original project for a single 1500-class of multi-role "fleet torpedo boat" was to be split into two new, separate roles. These were the previous torpilleur d'escadre, and a new role, torpilleur-éclaireur (torpedo scout). The primary role of this new class was to act as scouts for the fleet. The secondary role of the new, larger vessel was defending against attacks by enemy torpedo boats on the French line of battle. Attacking the enemy line of battle themselves, was a distant tertiary objective.

This shift in doctrine began in 1919, when Chief of the Naval General Staff, admiral Ferdinand-Jean-Jacques de Bon (fr) pointed out to Georges Leygues, the Minister of Marine, that between 1914–1918, the Italian Regia Marina had completed or laid down twelve flotilla leaders, compared to the French Navy, which had only built three during the four years of war. Italy, although allies to France during the Great War, was also seen as a growing rival to the Third Republic in the Mediterranean Sea. Flotilla Leaders were a type of destroyer that were larger and more heavily armed than normal destroyers and torpedo boats. These ships were designed to act as flagships for destroyer squadrons and to be able to defeat other destroyers. For the first time, using the English term, "destroyer", Admiral de Bon suggested than rebuilding of France's flotilla ship force should be the Marine Nationale's highest priority, followed by light cruisers and lastly capital ships. The flotilla craft force would be made up of the torpilleur d'escadre, and the new torpilleur-éclaireur. Minister Leygues agreed and accepted the suggestions of 4 March 1919.

The new design for the "torpedo scout", was based heavily on advancements in naval warfare developed during the First World War. Using intelligence on Allied shipbuilding plans, the Naval Constructors Department (Service technique des constructions navales, STCN) were influenced by the 2,000-tonne Italian Leone class and the 1,625-tonne Royal Navy Scott class. The design was also influenced by the former Imperial German Navy S113 a large torpedo boat (Großes Torpedoboot) which was taken by France after the Treaty of Versailles as reparations from Germany and recommissioned as Amiral Sénès. The German 'torpedo boat' (really a large destroyer) was even larger than the Leones, displacing 2,060 tonnes and armed with four 150 mm guns. The new design requirements called for a robust hull, with improved seakeeping abilities and speed. Newly developed 550 mm (22 in) Modèle 1919D torpedoes were chosen over the older 450 mm (18 in) Modèle 1912D torpedoes originally planned for the M89 design. The original torpilleur d'escadre was planned to be armed with 140 mm (6 in)/25 guns to be built by Schneider-Creusot. The problem was that now, their short barrel length made them unsuitable for the increased expected ranges destroyers were expected to fight at (12–15 km (7.5–9.3 mi)). In response to the new threat of air attack from airplanes, the new ships were to be armed with high-angle 75-millimetre (3.0 in)/50 anti-aircraft guns. The new "torpedo scout" was also now to be armed with 100 kg (220 lb) depth charges for use against another new weapon of war, submarines. Improved construction techniques were also requested. The new ships would be built with three compartments for damage control purposes, and each compartment would have a dedicated bilge pump. As design work continued the nomenclature continued to evolve. With greater emphasis on destroying enemy torpedo boats continued, the 'torpilleur-éclaireur' role continued to evolve and over time led to the revival of an older designation that had fallen out of usage since the 300-ton Branlebas class, the 'contre-torpilleur' (counter-torpedo boat), a large multi-role destroyer capable of scouting and combat.

== Cancellation ==
With these new technical requirements the Superior Naval Council (Conseil supérieur de la Marine)) proposed a final design for the Marine Nationales new generation of flotilla craft. A new torpilleur d'escadre and a new contre-torpilleur design were approved 28 April 1920 by the new incoming Minister of Marine, Adolphe Landry. Two contre-torpilleurs of the new design were accepted by the Ministry of Marine for the next naval estimates (naval budget) and were to be named Lion and Guépard. Both designs though suffered from the same issue, the main armament. The original requirements from the STCN called for 138.6 mm (5.5 in) guns. These guns would have a longer range than the M89s 140 mm (6 in) guns (which were never built). The choice of a 138.6 mm (5.5 in) gun would give French destroyers a heavier calibre than the contemporary British 120 mm/40 naval gun and the Italian 120 mm/45 naval gun. Instead the CSM contre-torpilleur design was armed with five single mounted Canon de 100 mm Modèle 1917 which were the most modern French destroyer guns available at the time. The STCN reluctantly accepted the design for the two destroyers in order to expedite construction. The Lion-class destroyers were to act essentially as prototypes for future French destroyers and her successors were expected to be armed with larger calibre guns. Concerns about the small calibre main armament of the destroyers continued to dog the project even after acceptance by the STCN. The French Parliament which shared similar concerns, eventually rejected funding for the two ships. Work on the destroyer project continued after this set back. On 14 January 1921 work began on designing a larger, more heavily armed contre-torpilleur based on the Lion class which eventually became the Chacal class. Work on the torpilleur d'escadre program became the Bourrasque class and was initially also to be armed with four of the same 100 mm guns as the Lion class. Both of these destroyer programmes were eventually armed with the recently developed Canon de 130 mm Modèle 1919.

== Bibliography ==
- Jourdan, John (2015). "Introduction". French Destroyers: Torpilleurs d'Escadre and Contre-Torpilleurs, 1922-1956. Barnsley, South Yorkshire: Seaforth Publishing. pp. 12–21. ISBN 978-1-84832-198-4.
