= French destroyer Mangini =

Destroyer of the French Navy

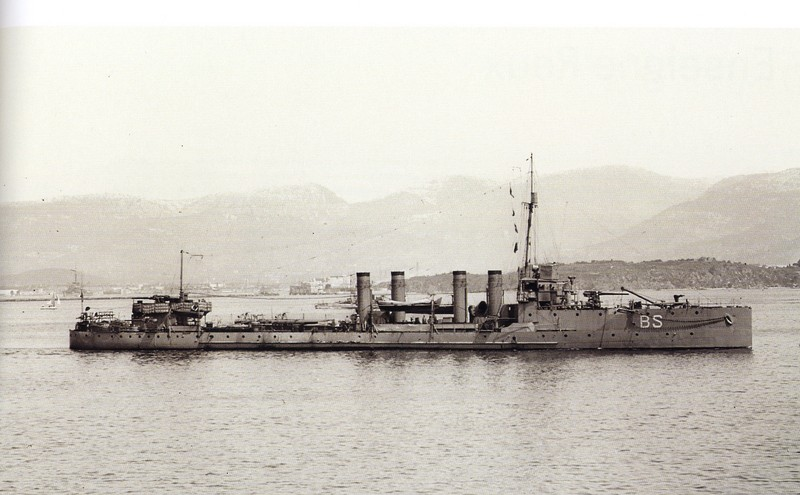
- Sister ship Bisson in harbor

History

France
- Name: Mangini
- Builder: Schneider et Cie, Chalon-sur-Saône
- Laid down: 1911
- Launched: 31 March 1913
- Completed: 1914
- Stricken: 1934

General characteristics
- Class & type: Bisson-class destroyer
- Displacement: 756–791 t (744–779 long tons)
- Length: 78.1 m (256 ft 3 in) (p/p)
- Beam: 8.6 m (28 ft 3 in)
- Draft: 3.1 m (10 ft 2 in)
- Installed power: 15,000 shp (11,185 kW); 4 water-tube boilers
- Propulsion: 2 shafts; 2 steam turbines
- Speed: 30 knots (56 km/h; 35 mph)
- Range: 1,950 nmi (3,610 km; 2,240 mi) at 14 knots (26 km/h; 16 mph)
- Complement: 80–83
- Armament: 2 × single 100 mm (3.9 in) guns; 4 × single 65 mm (2.6 in) guns; 2 × twin 450 mm (17.7 in) torpedo tubes

Mangini was one of six Bisson-class destroyers built for the French Navy during the 1910s. The ship was condemned in 1934.

== Design and description ==
The Bisson class were enlarged versions of the preceding Bouclier class built to a more standardized design. The ships had a length between perpendiculars of 78.1 meters (256 ft 3 in), a beam of 8.6 meters (28 ft 3 in), and a draft of 3.1 meters (10 ft 2 in). Designed to displace 850–880 metric tons (837–866 long tons), they displaced 756–791 t (744–779 long tons) at normal load. Their crew numbered 80–83 men.

Mangini was powered by a pair of Zoelly steam turbines, each driving one propeller shaft using steam provided by four Indret water-tube boilers. The engines were designed to produce 15,000 shaft horsepower (11,000 kW) which was intended to give the ships a speed of 30 knots (56 km/h; 35 mph). During her sea trials, Mangini reached a speed of 30.93 knots (57.28 km/h; 35.59 mph). The ships carried enough fuel oil to give them a range of 1,450 nautical miles (2,690 km; 1,670 mi) at cruising speeds of 14 knots (26 km/h; 16 mph).

The primary armament of the Bisson-class ships consisted of two 100-millimeter (3.9 in) Modèle 1893 guns in single mounts, one each fore and aft of the superstructure, and four 65-millimeter (2.6 in) Modèle 1902 guns distributed amidships. They were also fitted with two twin rotating mounts for 450-millimeter (17.7 in) torpedo tubes amidships.

== Construction and career ==
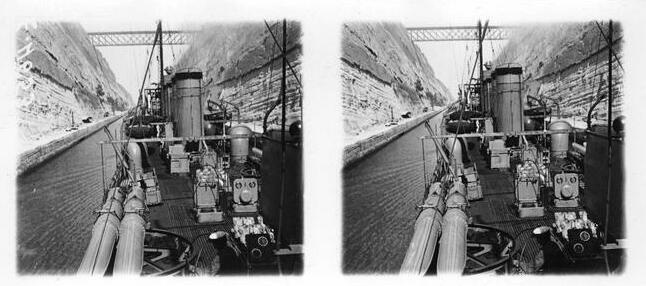
Mangini passing through the Corinth Canal on 2 September 1917

Mangini was ordered from Schneider et Cie and was launched from its Chalon-sur-Saône shipyard on 31 March 1913. The ship was completed the following year. When the First World War began in August 1914, Mangini was assigned to the 1st Destroyer Flotilla (1^{re} escadrille de torpilleurs) of the 1st Naval Army (1^{ère} Armée Navale). During the preliminary stages of the Battle of Antivari, Montenegro, on 16 August, the 1st, 4th and 5th Destroyer Flotillas were tasked to escort the core of the 1st Naval Army while the 2nd, 3rd and 6th Flotillas escorted the armored cruisers of the 2nd Light Squadron (2^{e} escadre légère) and two British cruisers. After reuniting both groups and spotting the Austro-Hungarian protected cruiser SMS Zenta and the destroyer SMS Ulan, the French destroyers played no role in sinking the cruiser, although the 4th Flotilla was sent on an unsuccessful pursuit of Ulan. Having broken the Austro-Hungarian blockade of Antivari (now known as Bar), Vice-Admiral (Vice-amiral) Augustin Boué de Lapeyrère, commander of the 1st Naval Army, decided to ferry troops and supplies to the port using a small requisitioned passenger ship, SS Liamone, escorted by the 2nd Light Squadron, reinforced by the armored cruiser Ernest Renan, and escorted by the destroyer Bouclier with the 1st and 6th Destroyer Flotillas under command while the rest of the 1st Naval Army bombarded the Austro-Hungarian naval base at Cattaro, Montenegro, on 1 September. Four days later, the fleet covered the evacuation of Danilo, Crown Prince of Montenegro, aboard Bouclier, to the Greek island of Corfu. The flotilla escorted multiple small convoys loaded with supplies and equipment to Antivari, beginning in October and lasting for the rest of the year, always covered by the larger ships of the Naval Army in futile attempts to lure the Austro-Hungarian fleet into battle. Amidst these missions, the 1st and 6th Flotillas were led by the French destroyer Dehorter as they conducted a sweep south of Cattaro on the night of 10/11 November in an unsuccessful search for Austro-Hungarian destroyers.

The torpedoing of the French battleship Jean Bart on 21 December caused a change in French tactics as the battleships were too important to risk to submarine attack. Henceforth, only the destroyers would escort the transports. After Italy signed the Treaty of London and declared war on the Austro-Hungarian Empire on 23 May 1915, Boué de Lapeyrère reorganized his forces in late June to cover the approaches to the Adriatic and interdict merchant shipping of the Central Powers since the Royal Italian Navy (Regia Marina) now had primary responsibility for the Adriatic itself. His area of responsibility extended from Sardinia to Crete and he divided it into two zones with the 1st Light Squadron assigned to the western zone and the 2nd Light Squadron in the east. Those destroyers of the 1st Naval Army not assigned to reinforce the Italians were transferred to the newly-formed 1st and 2nd Flotillas of the Naval Army (flotille d'Armée navale). The 1st and 3rd Destroyer Flotillas were assigned to the 2nd Flotilla of the Naval Army, of which ‘’Dehorter’’ was the flagship, which was tasked to support the cruisers of the 2nd Light Division.

On 18 April 1918, (Note: Some sources date the collision on 10 April.) she rammed and sank destroyer Faulx in the Strait of Otranto after her steering broke down.

== Bibliography ==
- Couhat, Jean Labayle (1974). French Warships of World War I. London: Ian Allan. ISBN 0-7110-0445-5.
- Freivogel, Zvonimir (2019). The Great War in the Adriatic Sea 1914–1918. Zagreb: Despot Infinitus. ISBN 978-953-8218-40-8.
- Jordan, John & Caresse, Philippe (2019). French Armoured Cruisers 1887–1932. Barnsley, UK: Seaforth Publishing. ISBN 978-1-5267-4118-9.
- Prévoteaux, Gérard (2017). La marine française dans la Grande guerre: les combattants oubliés: Tome I 1914–1915 [The French Navy during the Great War: The Forgotten Combatants, Book I 1914–1915]. Collection Navires & Histoire des Marines du Mond. Vol. 23. Le Vigen, France: Éditions Lela presse. ISBN 978-2-37468-000-2.
- Prévoteaux, Gérard (2017). La marine française dans la Grande guerre: les combattants oubliés: Tome II 1916–1918 [The French Navy during the Great War: The Forgotten Combatants, Book II 1916–1918]. Collection Navires & Histoire des Marines du Mond. Vol. 27. Le Vigen, France: Éditions Lela presse. ISBN 978-2-37468-001-9.
- Roberts, Stephen S. (2021). French Warships in the Age of Steam 1859–1914: Design, Construction, Careers and Fates. Barnsley, UK: Seaforth Publishing. ISBN 978-1-5267-4533-0.
- Smigielski, Adam (1985). "France". In Gray, Randal (ed.). Conway's All the World's Fighting Ships 1906–1921. Annapolis, Maryland: Naval Institute Press. pp. 190–220. ISBN 0-87021-907-3.
