= M89 =

M89 or M-89 may refer to:

- Messier 89, an elliptical galaxy in the constellation Virgo
- M-89 (Michigan highway), a state highway in Michigan
- M89SR sniper rifle, a gas operated semi-automatic sniper rifle
- M89-class destroyer, a planned class of French destroyers
