= French destroyer Enseigne Roux =

Destroyer of the French Navy

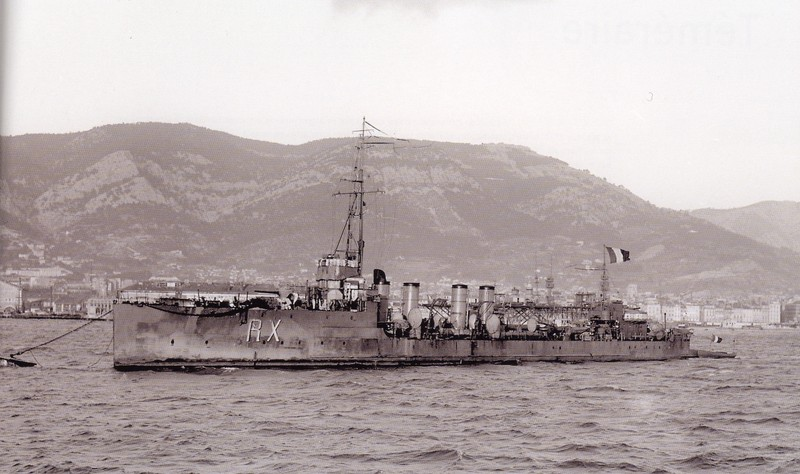
- Enseigne Roux at anchor

History

France
- Name: Enseigne Roux
- Builder: Arsenal de Rochefort
- Laid down: 13 December 1913
- Launched: 13 July 1915
- Completed: 1916
- Stricken: 1936
- Fate: Scrapped after 1935

General characteristics (as built)
- Class & type: Enseigne Roux-class destroyer
- Displacement: 850 t (837 long tons) (normal); 1,075 t (1,058 long tons) (deep load)
- Length: 82.6 m (271 ft) (o/a)
- Beam: 8.6 m (28 ft 3 in)
- Draft: 3 m (9 ft 10 in)
- Installed power: 4 water-tube boilers; 17,000 shp (13,000 kW)
- Propulsion: 2 shafts; 2 steam turbines
- Speed: 30 knots (56 km/h; 35 mph)
- Range: 1,400 nmi (2,600 km; 1,600 mi) at 14 knots (26 km/h; 16 mph)
- Complement: 76–81
- Armament: 2 × single 100 mm (3.9 in) Mle 1893 guns; 4 × single 65 mm (2.6 in) Mle 1902 guns; 2 × twin 450 mm (18 in) torpedo tubes

The French destroyer Enseigne Roux was the name ship of her class of three destroyers built for the French Navy during the First World War.

== Design and description ==
The Enseigne Roux class were an enlarged version of the preceding Bisson class. The ships had an overall length of 82.6 meters (271 ft 0 in), a beam of 8.6 meters (28 ft 3 in), and a draft of 3 meters (9 ft 10 in). They displaced 850 metric tons (837 long tons) at normal load. Their crew numbered 76–81 men.

The ships were powered by a pair of Parsons steam turbines, each driving one propeller shaft using steam provided by four water-tube boilers. The engines were designed to produce 17,000 shaft horsepower (13,000 kW) which was intended to give the ships a speed of 30 knots (56 km/h; 35 mph). During her sea trials, Enseigne Roux reached a speed of 30.4 knots (56.3 km/h; 35.0 mph). The ships carried enough fuel oil to give them a range of 1,400 nautical miles (2,600 km; 1,600 mi) at cruising speeds of 14 knots (26 km/h; 16 mph).

The primary armament of the Enseigne Roux-class ships consisted of two 100-millimeter (3.9 in) Modèle 1893 guns in single mounts, one each fore and aft of the superstructure, and four 65-millimeter (2.6 in) Modèle 1902 guns distributed amidships. They were also fitted with two twin mounts for 450-millimeter (17.7 in) torpedo tubes amidships.

== Construction and career ==
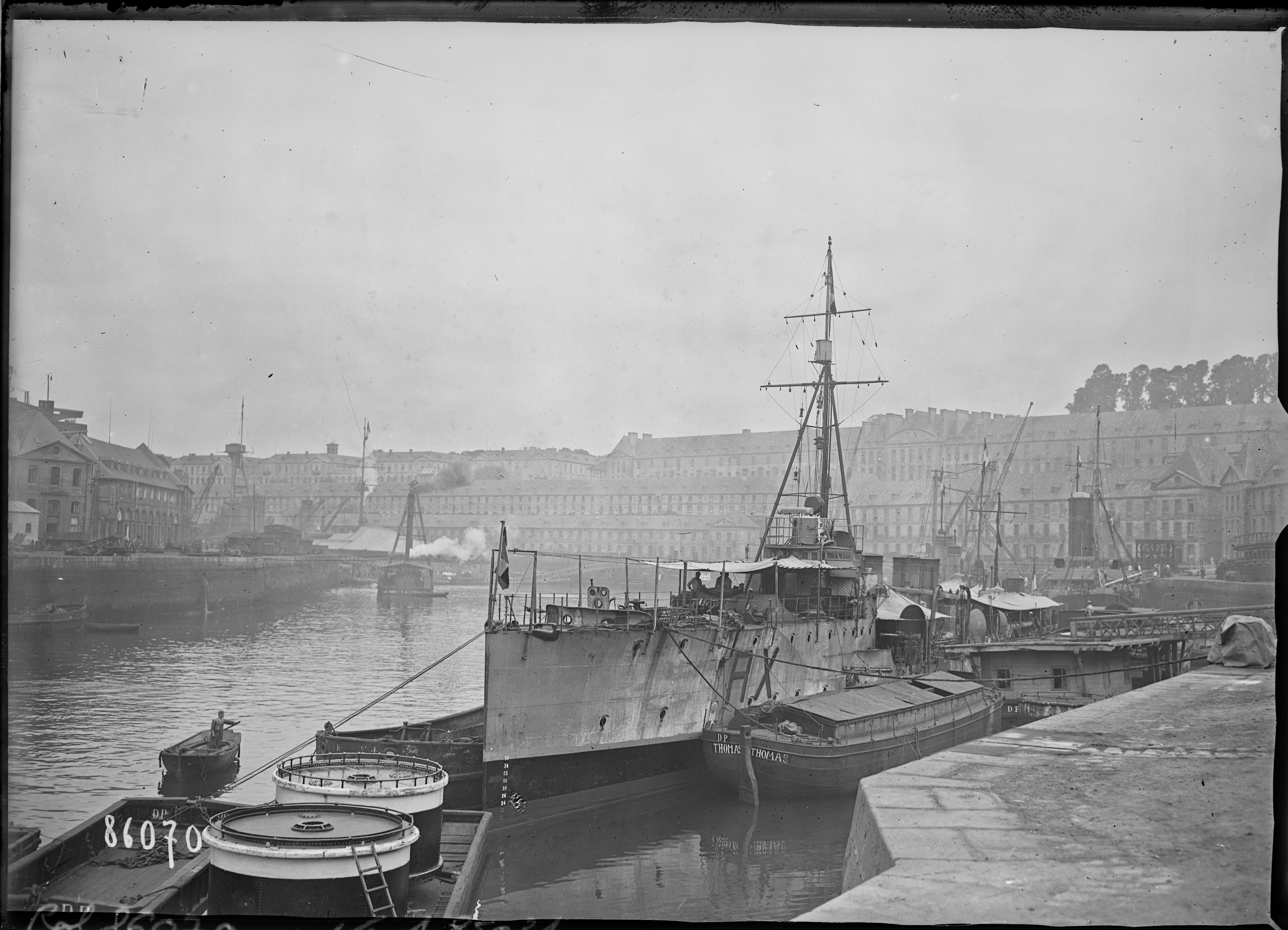
Enseigne Roux in Brest, 1923

Enseigne Roux was ordered from the Arsenal de Rochefort and was laid down on 13 December 1913. The ship was launched on 13 July 1915 and completed the following year. She spent the war assigned to the Dunkirk Flotilla, defending the English Channel.
