= French destroyer Commandant Lucas =

Destroyer of the French Navy

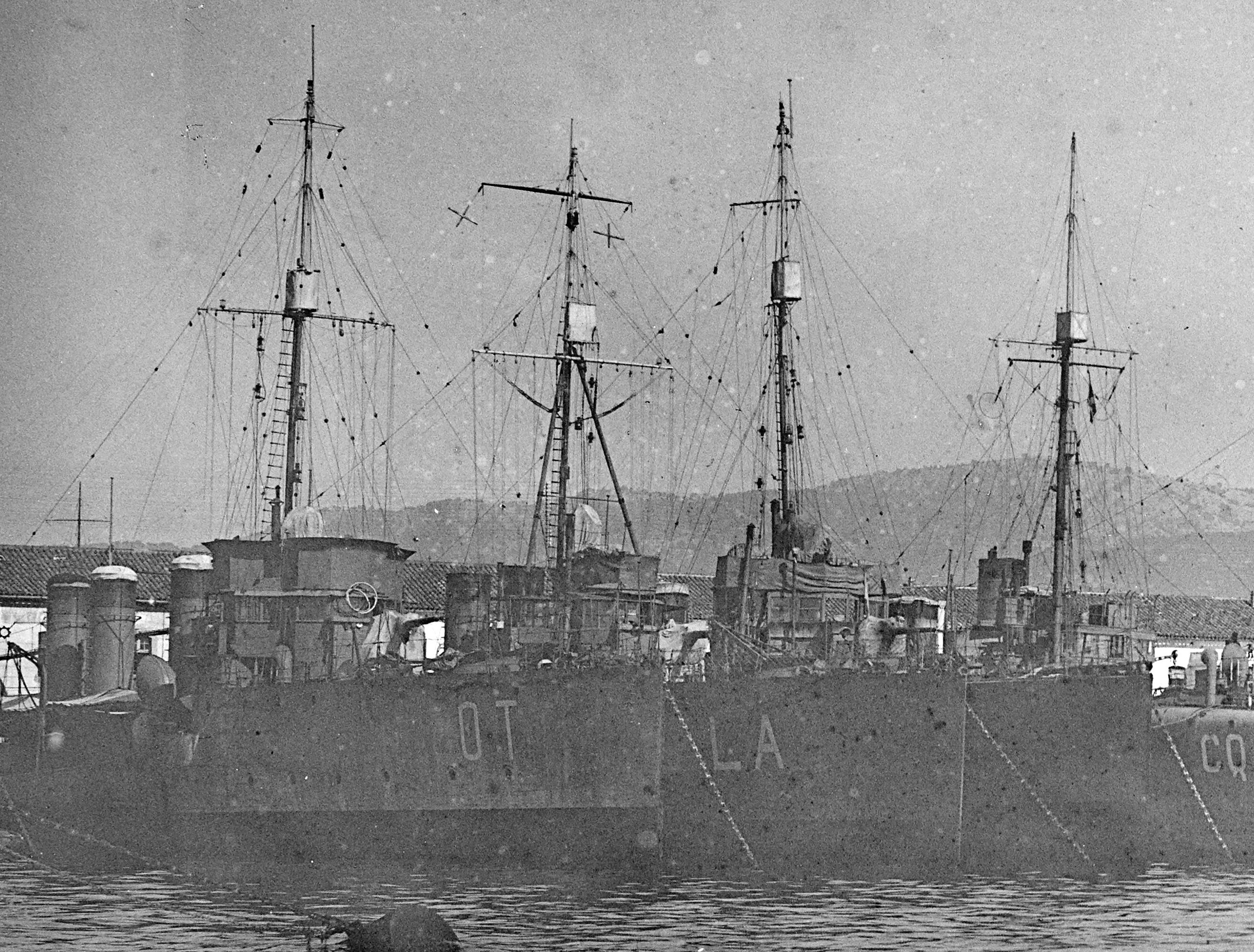
- Commandant Lucas (LA, second from left) and sister ship Protet (OT, left) at anchor in Toulon, 1926

History

France
- Name: Commandant Lucas
- Builder: Arsenal de Toulon
- Laid down: February 1912
- Launched: 11 July 1914
- Completed: 1914
- Stricken: June 1933

General characteristics
- Class & type: Bisson-class destroyer
- Displacement: 756–791 t (744–779 long tons)
- Length: 78.1 m (256 ft 3 in) (p/p)
- Beam: 8.6 m (28 ft 3 in)
- Draft: 3.1 m (10 ft 2 in)
- Installed power: 15,000 shp (11,185 kW); 4 water-tube boilers
- Propulsion: 2 shafts; 2 steam turbines
- Speed: 30 knots (56 km/h; 35 mph)
- Range: 1,950 nmi (3,610 km; 2,240 mi) at 14 knots (26 km/h; 16 mph)
- Complement: 80–83
- Armament: 2 × single 100 mm (3.9 in) guns; 4 × single 65 mm (2.6 in) guns; 2 × twin 450 mm (17.7 in) torpedo tubes

Commandant Lucas was one of six Bisson-class destroyers built for the French Navy during the 1910s.

== Design and description ==
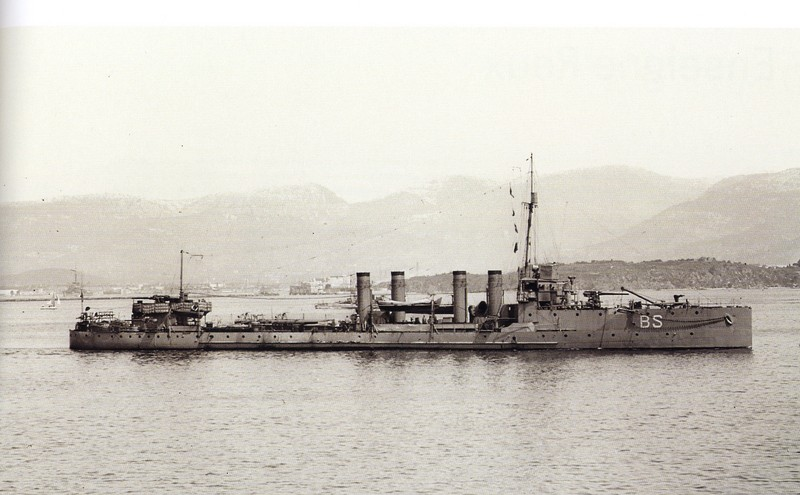
Sister ship Bisson in harbor

The Bisson class were enlarged versions of the preceding Bouclier class built to a more standardized design. The ships had a length between perpendiculars of 78.1 meters (256 ft 3 in), a beam of 8.6 meters (28 ft 3 in), and a draft of 3.1 meters (10 ft 2 in). Designed to displace 850–880 metric tons (837–866 long tons), they displaced 756–791 t (744–779 long tons) at normal load. Their crew numbered 80–83 men.

Commandant Lucas was powered by a pair of Breguet steam turbines, each driving one propeller shaft using steam provided by four Indret water-tube boilers. The engines were designed to produce 15,000 shaft horsepower (11,000 kW) which was intended to give the ships a speed of 30 knots (56 km/h; 35 mph). During her sea trials, Commandant Lucas reached a speed of 30.02 knots (55.60 km/h; 34.55 mph). The ships carried enough fuel oil to give them a range of 1,450 nautical miles (2,690 km; 1,670 mi) at cruising speeds of 14 knots (26 km/h; 16 mph).

The primary armament of the Bisson-class ships consisted of two 100-millimeter (3.9 in) Modèle 1893 guns in single mounts, one each fore and aft of the superstructure, and four 65-millimeter (2.6 in) Modèle 1902 guns distributed amidships. They were also fitted with two twin mounts for 450-millimeter (17.7 in) torpedo tubes amidships.

== Construction and career ==
Commandant Lucas was ordered from the Arsenal de Toulon and was launched on 11 July 1914. The ship was completed later that year.

== Bibliography ==
- Couhat, Jean Labayle (1974). French Warships of World War I. London: Ian Allan. ISBN 0-7110-0445-5.
- Freivogel, Zvonimir (2019). The Great War in the Adriatic Sea 1914–1918. Zagreb: Despot Infinitus. ISBN 978-953-8218-40-8.
- Gardiner, Robert & Gray, Randal (1985). Conway's All The World's Fighting Ships 1906–1921. London: Conway Maritime Press. ISBN 0-85177-245-5.
- Prévoteaux, Gérard (2017). La marine française dans la Grande guerre: les combattants oubliés: Tome I 1914–1915 [The French Navy during the Great War: The Forgotten Combatants, Book I 1914–1915]. Collection Navires & Histoire des Marines du Mond. Vol. 23. Le Vigen, France: Éditions Lela presse. ISBN 978-2-37468-000-2.
- Prévoteaux, Gérard (2017). La marine française dans la Grande guerre: les combattants oubliés: Tome II 1916–1918 [The French Navy during the Great War: The Forgotten Combatants, Book II 1916–1918]. Collection Navires & Histoire des Marines du Mond. Vol. 27. Le Vigen, France: Éditions Lela presse. ISBN 978-2-37468-001-9.
- Roberts, Stephen S. (2021). French Warships in the Age of Steam 1859–1914: Design, Construction, Careers and Fates. Barnsley, UK: Seaforth Publishing. ISBN 978-1-5267-4533-0.
