= M89-class destroyer =

Class overview
- Name: M89 class
- Operators: French Navy
- Preceded by: Enseigne Roux class
- Succeeded by: Aventurier class
- Planned: 9
- Completed: 0
- Cancelled: 9

General characteristics
- Type: destroyer
- Displacement: 1,530 tons (standard); 1,700 t (full load)
- Length: 97.9 m (321.2 ft) oa
- Beam: 10.3 m (33.8 ft)
- Installed power: 4 oil-fired Normand boilers; 38,000 shp (28,000 kW)
- Propulsion: 2-shaft Parsons geared turbines
- Speed: 33 knots (61 km/h; 38 mph)
- Range: 2,600 nautical miles (4,800 km; 3,000 mi) at 10 knots (19 km/h; 12 mph)
- Complement: 5 officers, 150 sailors
- Armament: 2 × 140 mm (5.5 in)/25 guns (2 × 1); 8 × 450 mm (18 in) torpedo tubes (2 × 3 + 2 × 1)
- Notes: Dimensions conjectural

The M89 class was a planned series of destroyers (torpilleur d'escadre) for the French Navy (Marine Nationale). Although initially designed in 1913, the scheduled construction of the two new destroyers was suspended due to the outbreak of World War I before either ship could be laid down. The two destroyers had not yet been given names, being known only by their planned construction numbers, M89 and M90.

== Design and development ==
The design of the M89-class destroyers originated in the promulgation of the Statut Naval (Naval Law) of 1912 by the French Minister of Marine on 30 March 1912. The new law set out to restructure and strengthen the French navy in the face of the rapid developments in naval technology and fleet size by France's continental neighbours, Germany and the United Kingdom with an emphasis on new classes of ships such as "super-dreadnought" battleships, light cruisers and larger, more heavily armed destroyers. All types of ships the French navy lacked. The Naval Law set out an ambitious goal for twenty-eight battleships, ten scout cruisers, fifty-two destroyers (fleet torpedo boats), ninety-four submarines and ten vessels for distant stations to be in service by the year 1920. Originally the fifty-two fleet torpedo boats were planned to include the ten 300-tonne Branlebas-class and the 450-tonne Spahi-class, Voltigeur-class, and Chasseur-class destroyers. This troubled the Chief of the French Naval General Staff (Directeur du Service des travaux), Vice Admiral Pierre Ange Marie Le Bris. There were serious concerns about the seaworthiness of the 300 and 450-tonne class destroyers to act as far-ranging 'fleet' vessels. It also meant that after the completion of the twenty (eventually twenty-one with the addition of Enseigne Gabolde) 800-tonne Bouclier-class, Bisson-class and Enseigne Roux-class ships, there would be no new French destroyers built for several years, which would likely create another technological gap between France and her neighbours. The Naval General Staff proposed a new class of 1,500-tonne destroyer, initially nine to complete the required fifty-two ship strong destroyer fleet mandated by the 1912 Naval Law. A further twenty-three would be built to eventually phase out the 300 and 450-tonne classes of destroyers by 1920 while maintaining a fleet of fifty-two destroyers.

=== 1914 project ===
Design work began in 1913 by the Naval Constructors Department (Service technique des constructions navales, STCN) on a new 1,500-tonne torpilleur d'escadre (fleet torpedo boat). The design focused on combat with other destroyers, an emphasis was placed on an expected combat distance of 3,000 m (9,842.5 ft), with fast, unstable, and unarmoured ships. The STCN committee recommended above all else, larger calibre guns compared to previous French destroyer designs, a 138.6 mm (5.46 in) gun was preferred. In the Spring of 1914, French arms manufacturer, Schneider-Creusot proposed production of a short 140 mm (5.5 in)/25 gun, with a sliding breech for the new ships. Other common areas of protection such as the conning tower and deck armour thickness are not known.

The final study was approved by the STCN on 9 June 1914. The final design was for a 1,530-ton ship, nearly twice as heavy as France's previous batch of 800-tonne destroyers. The armament would consist of two 140 mm (5.5 in) single mounted Schneider cannons, mounted fore and aft. Torpedo armament would consist of a total of eight 450 mm (18 in) torpedo tubes, two central, triple mounted launchers abaft the funnels and two single launchers mounted abeam the bridge. A four boiler, geared steam turbine was suggested, with an estimated 25,000–38,000 shp (19,000–28,000 kW) required to achieve the requested speed of 33 knots (61 km/h; 38 mph). The crew was to consist of five officers and one hundred-fifty sailors.

Two ships of this specification, designated M89 and M90 were pencilled into the projected 1915 building programme and were expected to be completed by 1917. In the Spring of 1914 the Navy Minister refused to incorporate the ships into the 1915 programme. This came as a surprise to the Navy, as they had already ordered the torpedoes for the expected ships. In the interim, the last 800-tonne destroyer, Enseigne Gabolde, would receive the M89 class' planned propulsion system and torpedoes. Studies on revamping the destroyer design continued until August 1914 and the start of World War I, but all naval construction plans fell into abeyance. The project would only be revived in Spring 1917.

=== 1918 project ===
Work on the destroyer design resumed in the Spring of 1917. While the 1914 requirements were officially reiterated, nearly three years of combat experience and advances in technology led to changes in the design. A renewed focus on sea-keeping was placed on the project along with French experience from her Triple Entente allies. The designs of the Regia Marinas Leone class and the Royal Navy V class were particularly influential on the evolution of French building plans. Based on wartime experience, rather than merely 3,000 m (9,842.5 ft), combat was now expected at 15 m (49.2 ft), which was now the maximum range of newly developed torpedoes. The armament was increased to three 140 mm (5.5 in)/25 guns, from the original two. The two single mounted 450 mm (18 in) torpedo launchers were eliminated, bringing the total amount of torpedo tubes down to six, but instead of the 450 mm (18 in) torpedoes, the ships would now carry newly developed 550 mm (22 in) torpedoes. Other wartime technologies also began to leave their mark on the destroyer design. With the new threat of enemy aircraft, staff requirements requested two (eventually, one) high-angle 75-millimetre (3.0 in)/50 anti-aircraft guns. The French navy also planned to adopt the British practice of a parallel flotilla leader (conducteur d'escadrille) sub-class of destroyer. These ships would be slightly larger to accommodate and additional 140 mm (5.5 in) gun, and the larger staff and additional equipment of a fleet commodore.

All these design changes and improvements though came at a cost. To accommodate these changes, the dimensions of the ship would have to be enlarged and the normal displacement increased to 1,650 tons. The machinery was changed to a 2/3-shaft geared, it was hoped that the single reduction geared turbine would deliver increased endurance. Power was increased to 40,000 shp (30,000 kW). These changes in propulsion were estimated to give the destroyers a trial speed of 35 knots (65 km/h; 40 mph), a full load speed of 32 knots (59 km/h; 37 mph) and an endurance of 3,600 nautical miles (6,700 km; 4,100 mi) at 15 knots (28 km/h; 17 mph). Shortly after the end of the war, on 28 November 1918, the STCN made their final staff requirements. These, in addition to those changes already mentioned, a flared bow with sheer was requested along with a more spacious bridge. The complement was finalized at seven officers and one hundred-sixty nine sailors.

By 25 February 1919, the Chief of the French Naval General Staff, vice admiral Ferdinand-Jean-Jacques de Bon (fr) pointed out that between 1914–1918, the French Navy had built three destroyers. In comparison, the Kingdom of Italy, France's erstwhile ally and potential Mediterranean rival, had built twelve flotilla leaders and forty torpedo boats. On 12 March 1919, de Bon immediately placed priority on destroyer construction, followed by light cruisers, and lastly, capital ships. The proposal was officially accepted by Minister of Marine, Georges Leygues on 4 March 1919.

=== End of project ===
Concerns about the main armament lingered with the Naval General Staff though, the Schneider 140-millimetre (5.5 in)/25 were not designed to operate at the newer, longer ranges expected in destroyer warfare. On 12 March 1919, Vice admiral de Bon approved Note sur les destroyers (Notes on destroyers). These notes was a major departure from previous French naval doctrines, which unusually, used the English term 'destroyers' rather than the French term torpilleur d'escadre. The Notes laid down two separate roles, the traditional torpilleur d'escadre role, which had the primary mission of attacking the enemy line of battle and the secondary mission of disrupting attacks on the French battle line by enemy torpedo boats. The second role called for a larger, more heavily armed ship. This became the contre-torpilleur (literally 'Counter torpedo boat'), a ship whose primary role was scouting, and a secondary role of protecting the battle line against other destroyers. A distant tertiary objective, was attacking the enemy battle line with torpedoes and gunfire. These two ship roles eventually led to the development of the Bourrasque-class torpilleur and the Lion-class contre-torpilleur (cancelled in 1920), which led to the Chacal class.

== See also ==
- La Motte-Picquet class - World War I French cruiser design series, never built.

== Bibliography ==
- Jordan, John & Moulin, Jean (2013). French Cruisers 1922-1956. Seaforth Publishing. ISBN 978-1-84832-133-5.
- Jordan, John & Moulin, Jean (2015). French Destroyers: Torpilleurs d'Escadre & Contre-Torpilleurs, 1922-1956. Naval Institute Press. ISBN 978-1-61251-868-8.
