= Bulgarian torpedo gunboat Nadezhda =

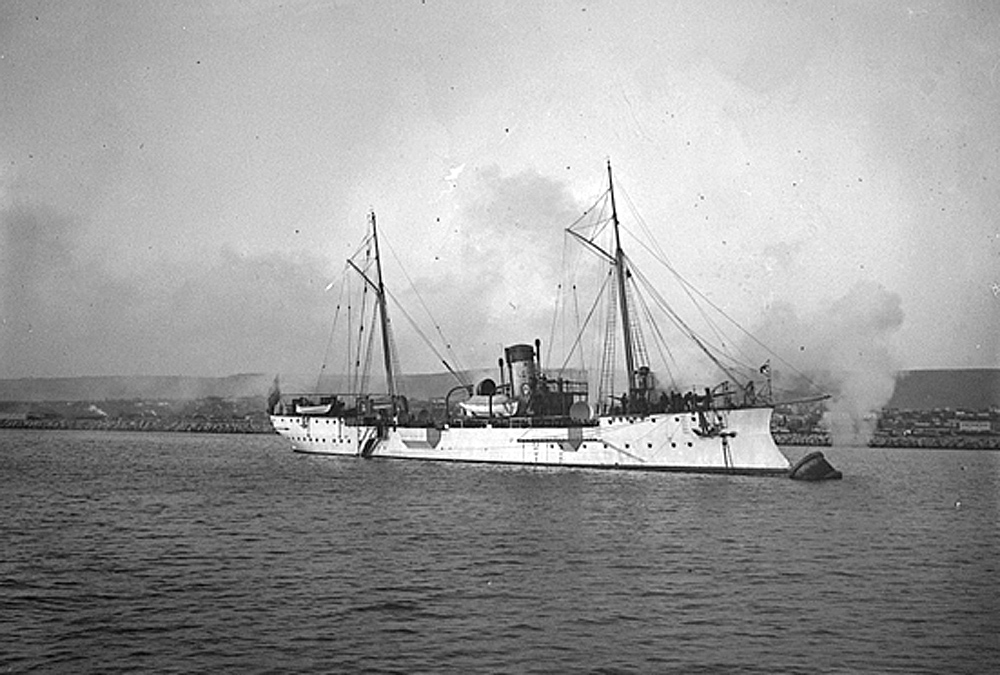

History

Bulgaria
- Name: Nadezhda
- Ordered: 1897
- Builder: Chantiers et Ateliers de la Gironde, Bordeaux, France
- Launched: 10 September 1898
- Commissioned: October 1898
- Fate: Abandoned at Sevastopol, December 1918

General characteristics
- Type: Torpedo gunboat/Torpedo cruiser
- Displacement: 715 tons
- Length: 67 m (220 ft)
- Beam: 8.3 m (27 ft)
- Draught: 3.1 m (10 ft)
- Propulsion: steam engine 2600 hp, 4 boilers
- Speed: 18 knots (33 km/h; 21 mph)
- Complement: 97
- Armament: 2 × 100 mm naval guns; 2 × 65 mm naval guns; 2 x 47 mm naval guns; 2 x 381 torpedo tubes

Nadezhda (Bulgarian: Надежда, lit. 'Hope') was an early 20th-century torpedo gunboat of Bulgaria, the largest warship ever possessed by the Royal Bulgarian Navy. It was often referred to as a cruiser by her Bulgarian owners, a designation that might not be too far-fetched, considering there were indeed smaller torpedo cruisers in service with the European navies of the time, such as the Italian Folgore-class.

== Construction ==
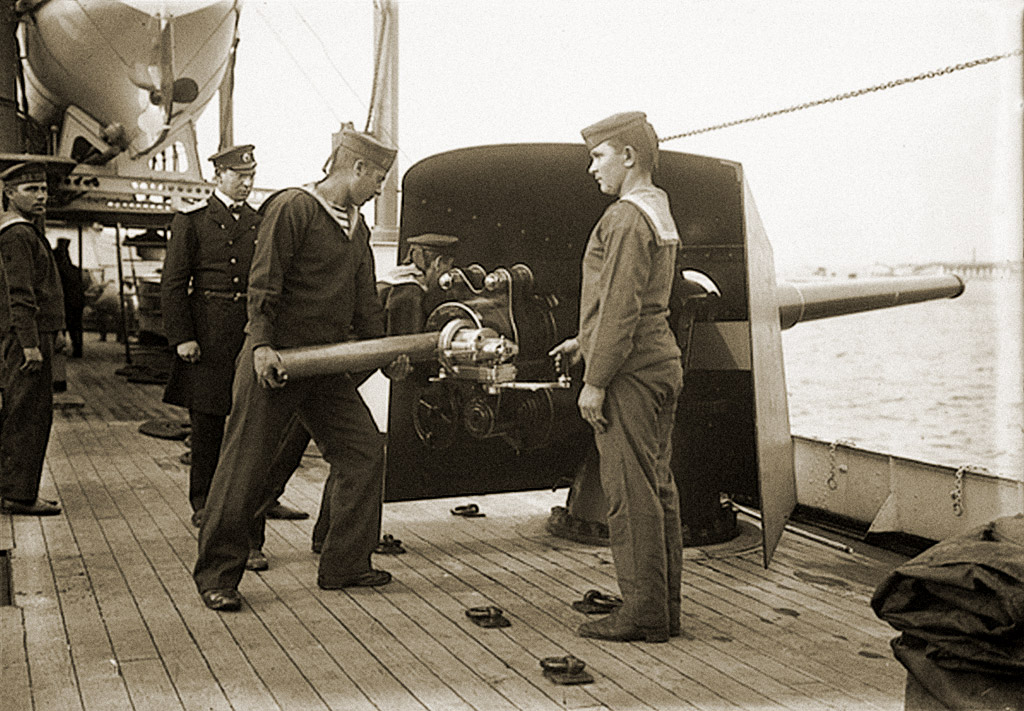
100 mm naval gun aboard Nadezhda

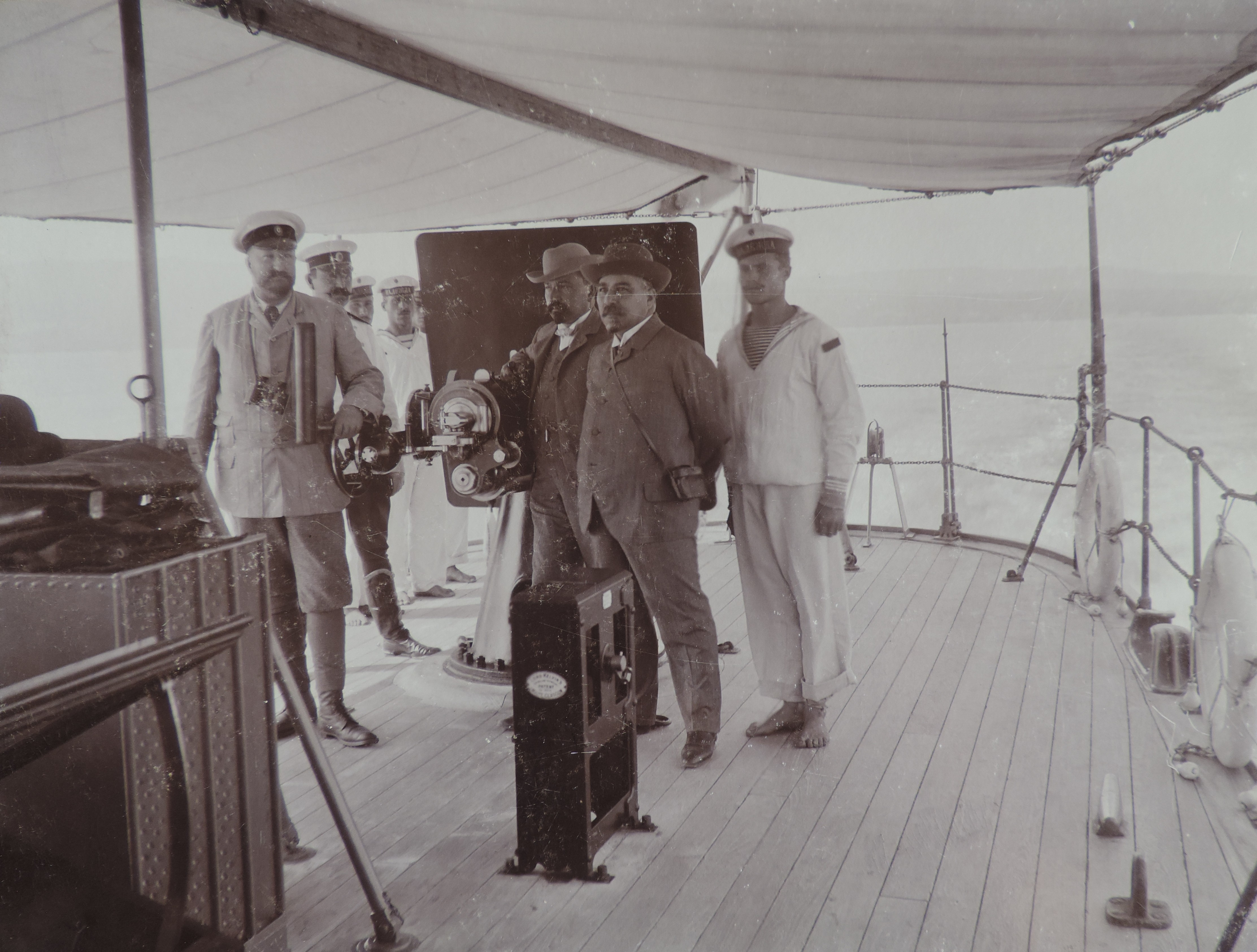
Tsar Ferdinand and Dimitar Rizov on Nadezhda's deck

Nadezhda was made of steel, built by Chantiers et Ateliers de la Gironde in Bordeaux, France, and was launched in 1898. The warship displaced 715 tons and measured 67 meters in length, had a beam of 8.30 meters and a draught of 3.10 meters. She was powered by four boilers generating a speed of 18 knots and had a crew of 97. Her armament consisted of six guns (2 x 100 mm, 2 x 65 mm, 2 x 47 mm) and two 381 mm torpedo tubes.

== Career ==
Nadezhda served as a royal yacht for the King of Bulgaria, the aft part of her deck house being converted into a lounge. In 1912 she ran aground, but was soon refloated and repaired. During the First Balkan War, she was disarmed due to her poor condition. Her guns were soon fitted again but were landed once more in 1915. In September 1918, she was taken to Sevastopol for repairs, but her crew abandoned her there in December that year.
