= Enseigne Roux-class destroyer =

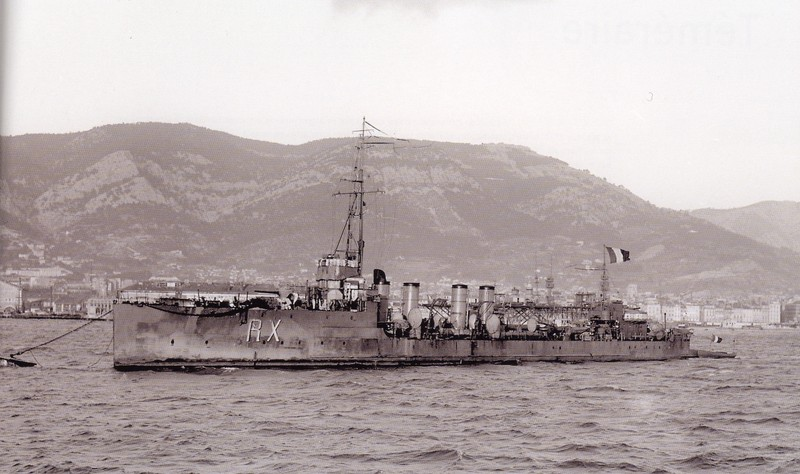
- Enseigne Roux at anchor

Class overview
- Name: Enseigne Roux class
- Builders: Arsenal de Rochefort
- Operators: French Navy
- Preceded by: Bisson class
- Succeeded by: M89 class (planned); Aventurier class (actual)
- Built: 1913–1915
- In commission: 1915–1936
- Planned: 3
- Completed: 2
- Scrapped: 2

General characteristics (as built)
- Type: Destroyer
- Displacement: 1,075 t (1,058 long tons) (deep load)
- Length: 82.6 m (271 ft) (o/a)
- Beam: 8.6 m (28 ft 3 in)
- Draft: 3 m (9 ft 10 in)
- Installed power: 4 water-tube boilers; 17,000 PS (13,000 kW; 17,000 shp)
- Propulsion: 2 shafts; 2 steam turbines
- Speed: 30 knots (56 km/h; 35 mph)
- Range: 1,400 nmi (2,600 km; 1,600 mi) at 14 knots (26 km/h; 16 mph)
- Complement: 81
- Armament: 2 × single 100 mm (3.9 in) guns; 4 × single 65 mm (2.6 in) guns; 2 × twin 450 mm (18 in) torpedo tubes

The Enseigne Roux class was the thirteenth class of destroyers to be built for the French Navy during World War I. The first two units of this class, the Enseigne Roux and the Mécanicien Principal Lestin saw use during the war. However, the construction of the third ship of the class — Enseigne Gabolde — was suspended in 1914. It was then resumed in 1921, and completed in 1923 to a modified design.

== Design and construction ==
The Ensigne Roux-class was an enlarged derivative of the previous Bisson-class, themselves an improved Bouclier. Two (Enseigne Roux and Mécanicien Principal Lestin) were ordered from Rochefort Dockyard to a standard design, while a third Enseigne Gabolde was ordered from the Le Havre shipyard of Normand to a modified design, with different machinery.

Enseigne Roux and Mécanicien Principal Lestin were 82.6 metres (271 ft) long, with a beam of 8.60 metres (28 ft 3 in). They displaced 1,075 tonnes (1,058 long tons). Four boilers fed two sets of direct-drive Parsons steam turbines rated at 17,000 shaft horsepower (13,000 kW) which drove two propeller shafts, giving a design speed of 30 knots (56 km/h; 35 mph). (Note: Mécanicien Principal Lestin reached a speed of 31.21 knots (57.80 km/h; 35.92 mph) during sea trials.) Enseigne Gabolde was longer, and was fitted with geared steam turbines instead of direct-drive units. These were rated at 20,000 shaft horsepower (15,000 kW), with a design speed of 31 knots (57 km/h; 36 mph).

The design armament was as for the previous two classes, i.e. two 100-millimetre (3.9 in) Mle 1893 guns, four 65-millimetre (2.6 in) Mle 1902 guns and two twin 450 mm torpedo tubes. During the First World War, a 75-millimetre (3 in) anti-aircraft gun was added, with an anti-submarine armament of ten depth charges and a towed explosive sweep.

Enseigne Roux and Mécanicien Principal Lestin were laid down in late 1913, launched in 1915 and completed in 1916. Construction of Enseigne Gabolde was suspended due to the war, with her boilers used in other ships, with work not restarting until after the end of the war, and she was not completed until 1923.

== Ships ==
Name	Builder	Launched	Fate
Enseigne Roux	Arsenal de Rochefort	13 July 1915	Struck, 1936
Mécanicien Principal Lestin	Arsenal de Rochefort	15 May 1915	Struck, 1936
