= French destroyer Enseigne Gabolde =

Destroyer of the French Navy

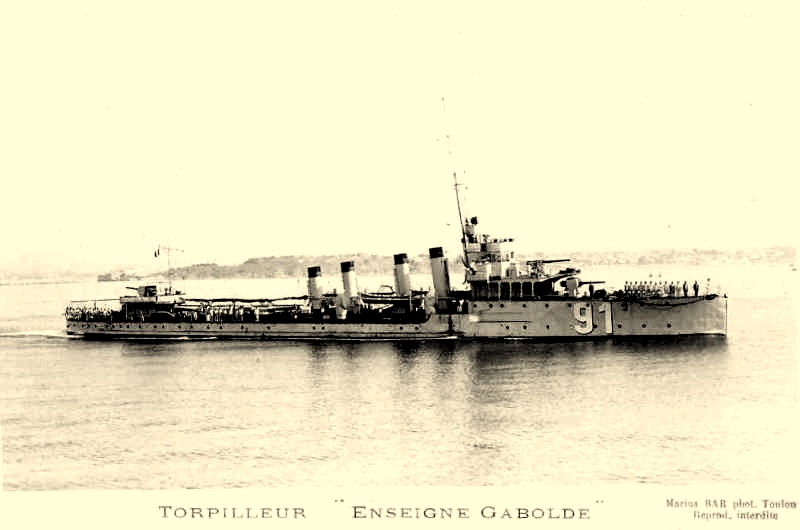

Class overview
- Name: Enseigne Gabolde
- Operators: French Navy
- Preceded by: Arabe class
- Succeeded by: Bourrasque class
- Completed: 1
- Scrapped: 1

History

France
- Name: Enseigne Gabolde
- Ordered: 1913
- Builder: Chantiers et Ateliers Augustin Normand, Le Havre
- Laid down: 26 June 1914
- Launched: 23 April 1921
- Completed: 1923
- Stricken: 1938

General characteristics (as built)
- Type: Destroyer
- Displacement: 950 t (935 long tons) (normal)
- Length: 83.6 m (274 ft) (o/a)
- Beam: 8.21 m (26 ft 11 in)
- Draft: 3.12 m (10 ft 3 in)
- Installed power: 4 Normand boilers; 20,000 shp (15,000 kW)
- Propulsion: 2 shafts; 2 steam turbines
- Speed: 31 knots (57 km/h; 36 mph)
- Range: 1,300 nmi (2,400 km; 1,500 mi) at 14 knots (26 km/h; 16 mph)
- Complement: 80
- Armament: 3 × single 100 mm (3.9 in) Mle 1893 guns; 1 × single 75 mm (3 in) AA gun; 2 × twin 550 mm (21.7 in) torpedo tubes

Enseigne Gabolde was a destroyer built for the French Navy. Originally laid down in 1914 as a member of the Enseigne Roux class, construction was suspended in 1914 when the First World War began and was not resumed to a modified design until after the war. She was condemned in 1938 and subsequently scrapped.

== Design and description ==
Enseigne Gabolde had an overall length of 83.6 meters (274 ft 3 in), a beam of 8.21 meters (26 ft 11 in), and a draft of 3.12 meters (10 ft 3 in). She displaced 950 metric tons (935 long tons) at normal load and her crew numbered 80 men.

The ship was powered by a pair of Parsons steam turbines, each driving one propeller shaft using steam provided by four Normand boilers. The engines were designed to produce 20,000 shaft horsepower (15,000 kW) which was intended to give her a speed of 31 knots (57 km/h; 36 mph). During her sea trials, Enseigne Gabolde reached a speed in excess of 33 knots (61 km/h; 38 mph) from 26,000 shp (19,000 kW). The ship stowed 196 tonnes (193 long tons) of fuel oil that gave her a range of 1,300 nautical miles (2,400 km; 1,500 mi) at cruising speeds of 14 knots (26 km/h; 16 mph).

The primary armament of Enseigne Gabolde consisted of three 100-millimeter (3.9 in) Modèle 1893 guns in single mounts, one superfiring pair forward of the superstructure and the remaining gun on a platform on the stern. For anti-aircraft defense she was equipped with a single 75-millimeter (3 in) AA gun. The ship was also fitted with two twin mounts for 550-millimeter (21.7 in) torpedo tubes amidships.

== Construction and career ==
Enseigne Gabolde was ordered from Chantiers et Ateliers Augustin Normand and was laid down on 26 June 1914. Construction was suspended later that year and did not resume until 1918 after the design was modified. The ship was launched on 23 April 1921 and was finally completed in 1923. She was struck in 1938.
