= French destroyer Capitaine Mehl =

Destroyer of the French Navy

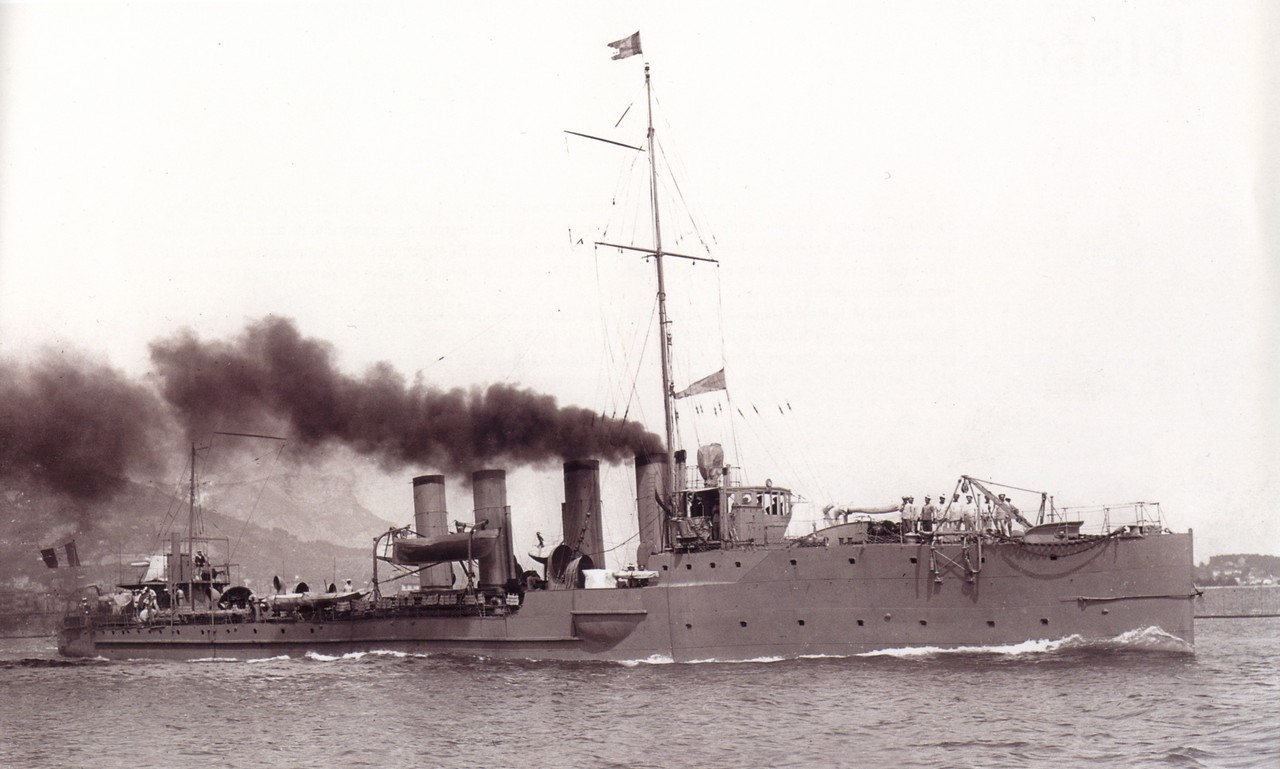
- Sister ship Bouclier underway

History

France
- Name: Capitaine Mehl
- Builder: Ateliers et Chantiers de la Loire, Saint-Nazaire
- Laid down: 1910
- Launched: 20 April 1912
- Completed: 1912
- Stricken: 10 July 1926

General characteristics (as built)
- Class & type: Bouclier-class destroyer
- Displacement: 720–756 t (709–744 long tons)
- Length: 72.3–78.3 m (237 ft 2 in – 256 ft 11 in) (o/a)
- Beam: 7.6–8 m (24 ft 11 in – 26 ft 3 in)
- Draft: 2.9–3.3 m (9 ft 6 in – 10 ft 10 in)
- Installed power: 4 water-tube boilers; 13,000 shp (9,694 kW)
- Propulsion: 2 shafts; 2 steam turbines
- Speed: 30 knots (56 km/h; 35 mph)
- Range: 1,200–1,600 nmi (2,200–3,000 km; 1,400–1,800 mi) at 12–14 knots (22–26 km/h; 14–16 mph)
- Complement: 80–83
- Armament: 2 × 100 mm (3.9 in) Mle 1893 guns; 4 × 65 mm (2.6 in) Mle 1902 guns; 2 × twin 450 mm (17.7 in) torpedo tubes

Capitaine Mehl was one of a dozen Bouclier-class destroyers built for the French Navy in the first decade of the 20th century.

== Design and description ==
The Bouclier class were designed to a general specification and varied significantly from each other in various ways. The ships had an overall length of 74–78.3 meters (242 ft 9 in – 256 ft 11 in), a beam of 7.6–8 meters (24 ft 11 in – 26 ft 3 in), and a draft of 2.9–3.1 meters (9 ft 6 in – 10 ft 2 in). Designed to displace 800 metric tons (787 long tons), they displaced 720–756 t (709–744 long tons) at normal load. Their crew numbered 80–83 men.

The ships were powered by a pair of Parsons steam turbines, each driving one propeller shaft using steam provided by four water-tube boilers. The engines were designed to produce 13,000 shaft horsepower (9,700 kW) which was intended to give the ships a speed of 30 knots (56 km/h; 35 mph). Capitaine Mehl handily exceed that speed, reaching 31.8 knots (58.9 km/h; 36.6 mph) during her sea trials. The ships carried enough fuel oil to give them a range of 1,200–1,600 nautical miles (2,200–3,000 km; 1,400–1,800 mi) at cruising speeds of 12–14 knots (22–26 km/h; 14–16 mph).

The primary armament of the Bouclier-class ships consisted of two 100-millimeter (3.9 in) Modèle 1893 guns in single mounts, one each fore and aft of the superstructure, and four 65-millimeter (2.6 in) Modèle 1902 guns distributed amidships. They were also fitted with two twin mounts for 450-millimeter (17.7 in) torpedo tubes amidships.

During World War I, a 45-millimeter (1.8 in) or 75-millimeter (3 in) anti-aircraft gun, two 8-millimeter (0.31 in) machine guns, and eight or ten Guiraud-type depth charges were added to the ships. The extra weight severely overloaded the ships and reduced their operational speed to around 26 knots (48 km/h; 30 mph).

== Construction and career ==
Capitaine Mehl was ordered from Ateliers et Chantiers de la Loire and was launched from its Saint-Nazaire shipyard on 20 April 1912. The ship was completed later that year.

== Bibliography ==
- Couhat, Jean Labayle (1974). French Warships of World War I. London: Ian Allan. ISBN 0-7110-0445-5.
- Prévoteaux, Gérard (2017). La marine française dans la Grande guerre: les combattants oubliés: Tome I 1914–1915 [The French Navy during the Great War: The Forgotten Combatants, Book I 1914–1915]. Collection Navires & Histoire des Marines du Mond. Vol. 23. Le Vigen, France: Éditions Lela presse. ISBN 978-2-37468-000-2.
- Prévoteaux, Gérard (2017). La marine française dans la Grande guerre: les combattants oubliés: Tome II 1916–1918 [The French Navy during the Great War: The Forgotten Combatants, Book II 1916–1918]. Collection Navires & Histoire des Marines du Mond. Vol. 27. Le Vigen, France: Éditions Lela presse. ISBN 978-2-37468-001-9.
- Roberts, Stephen S. (2021). French Warships in the Age of Steam 1859–1914: Design, Construction, Careers and Fates. Barnsley, UK: Seaforth Publishing. ISBN 978-1-5267-4533-0.
- Smigielski, Adam (1985). "France". In Gray, Randal (ed.). Conway's All the World's Fighting Ships 1906–1921. Annapolis, Maryland: Naval Institute Press. pp. 190–220. ISBN 0-87021-907-3.
