= French destroyer Bisson =

Destroyer of the French Navy

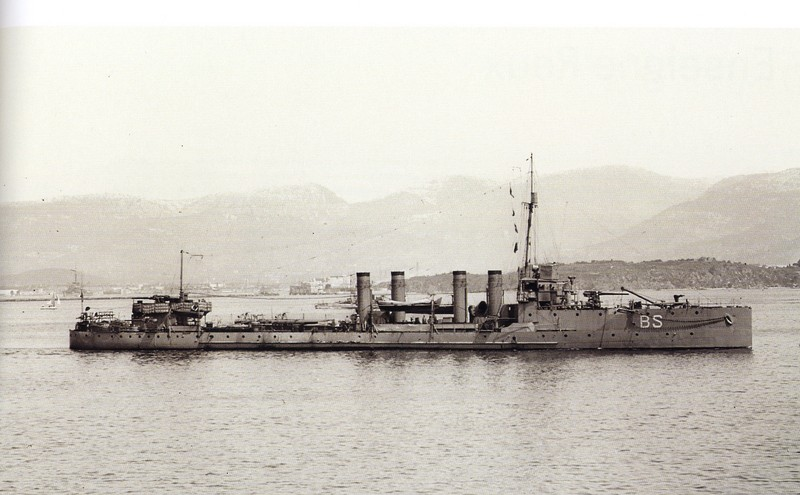
- Bisson in harbor

History

France
- Name: Bisson
- Ordered: 23 November 1910
- Builder: Arsenal de Toulon
- Laid down: 1 January 1911
- Launched: 12 September 1912
- Completed: 1913
- Commissioned: 8 September 1913
- Stricken: 15 February 1933

General characteristics
- Class & type: Bisson-class destroyer
- Displacement: 800 t (787 long tons) (normal)
- Length: 78.1 m (256 ft 3 in)
- Beam: 7.96 m (26 ft 1 in)
- Draft: 2.94 m (9 ft 8 in)
- Installed power: 4 Guyot-du Temple boilers; 15,000 shp (11,185 kW)
- Propulsion: 2 shafts; 2 steam turbines
- Speed: 30 knots (56 km/h; 35 mph)
- Range: 1,950 nmi (3,610 km; 2,240 mi) at 14 knots (26 km/h; 16 mph)
- Complement: 4 officers, 77–84 crewmen
- Armament: 2 × single 100 mm (3.9 in) guns; 4 × single 65 mm (2.6 in) guns; 2 × twin 450 mm (17.7 in) torpedo tubes

Bisson was the name ship of her class of destroyers built for the French Navy during the 1910s, entering service in 1913. She served in the Mediterranean Sea during the First World War, sinking the Austro-Hungarian submarine U-3 on 13 August 1915 and took part in the Battle of Durazzo in December 1915 and the Battle of the Strait of Otranto in May 1917. She was stricken in 1933 and scrapped in 1939.

== Design and description ==
The Bisson class were enlarged versions of the preceding Capitaine Mehl built to a more standardized design. The ships had an overall length of 78.1 meters (256 ft 3 in), a beam of 7.96 meters (26 ft 1 in), and a draft of 2.94 meters (9 ft 8 in). They displaced 800 metric tons (787 long tons) at normal load. Their crew numbered 4 officers and 77–84 enlisted ranks.

Renaudin was powered by a pair of Breguet steam turbines, each driving one propeller shaft using steam provided by four Guyot-du Temple water-tube boilers. The engines were designed to produce 15,000 shaft horsepower (11,000 kW) which was intended to give the ships a speed of 30 knots (56 km/h; 35 mph). During her sea trials, Renaudin reached a speed of 30.55 knots (56.58 km/h; 35.16 mph). The ships carried enough fuel oil to give them a range of 1,450 nautical miles (2,690 km; 1,670 mi) at a cruising speed of 14 knots (26 km/h; 16 mph).

The primary armament of the Bisson-class ships consisted of two 100-millimeter (3.9 in) Modèle 1893 guns in single mounts, one each fore and aft of the superstructure, and four 65-millimeter (2.6 in) Modèle 1902 guns distributed amidships. They were also fitted with two twin mounts for 450-millimeter (17.7 in) torpedo tubes amidships, one on each broadside.

== Construction and career ==
Bisson was ordered on 23 November 1910 as part of the 1910 naval program from the Arsenal de Toulon and was laid down on 1 January 1911. She was launched on 12 September 1912 and began her sea trials on 10 February 1913. The ship was commissioned on 8 September and was assigned to the 6th Destroyer Flotilla (6^{e} escadrille de torpilleurs) of the 1st Naval Army (1^{ère} Armée Navale) in the Mediterranean.

=== First World War ===
During the preliminary stages of the Battle of Antivari, Montenegro, on 16 August 1914, (Note: Prévoteaux lists Bisson as under repair on 1 August. Exactly when those were completed and the ship entered active service is unknown.) the 1st, 4th and 5th Destroyer Flotillas were tasked to escort the core of the 1st Naval Army while the 2nd, 3rd and 6th Flotillas escorted the armored cruisers of the 2nd Light Squadron (2^{e} escadre légère) and two British cruisers. After reuniting both groups and spotting the Austro-Hungarian protected cruiser SMS Zenta and the destroyer SMS Ulan, the French destroyers played no role in sinking the cruiser, although the 4th Flotilla was sent on an unsuccessful pursuit of Ulan. Having broken the Austro-Hungarian blockade of Antivari (now known as Bar), Vice-Admiral (Vice-amiral) Augustin Boué de Lapeyrère, commander of the 1st Naval Army, decided to ferry troops and supplies to the port using a small requisitioned passenger ship, SS Liamone, escorted by the 2nd Light Squadron, reinforced by the armored cruiser Ernest Renan, and escorted by the destroyer Bouclier with the 1st and 6th Destroyer Flotillas under command while the rest of the 1st Naval Army bombarded the Austro-Hungarian naval base at Cattaro, Montenegro, on 1 September. Four days later, the fleet covered the evacuation of Danilo, Crown Prince of Montenegro, aboard Bouclier, to the Greek island of Corfu. The flotilla escorted multiple small convoys loaded with supplies and equipment to Antivari, beginning in October and lasting for the rest of the year, always covered by the larger ships of the Naval Army in futile attempts to lure the Austro-Hungarian fleet into battle. Amidst these missions, the 1st and 6th Flotillas were led by the French destroyer Dehorter as they conducted a sweep south of Cattaro on the night of 10/11 November in an unsuccessful search for Austro-Hungarian destroyers.

The torpedoing of the French battleship Jean Bart on 21 December caused a change in French tactics as the battleships were too important to risk to submarine attack. Henceforth, only the destroyers would escort the transports, covered by cruisers at a distance of 20–50 miles (32–80 km) from the transports. The first convoy of 1915 to Antivari arrived on 11 January and more were made until the last one on 20–21 April. On 6 May 1915, Bisson and the armored cruiser Jules Ferry spotted the Austrian light cruiser Admiral Spaun between Cephalonia and Calabria and chased the Austrian ship, but Admiral Spaun outpaced the two French ships and escaped. After Italy signed the Treaty of London and declared war on the Austro-Hungarian Empire on 23 May, the ship was still assigned to the 6th Flotilla when the unit was transferred to the 1st Division of Destroyers and Submarines (1^{ère} division de torpilleurs et de sous-marines) of the 2nd Squadron (escadre) based at Brindisi, Italy. On 24–26 May, Bisson and the destroyer Commandant Rivière escorted five submarines from Malta to their new base at Brindisi.

Regular duties included escorting ships to Montenegro and supporting Franco-Italian patrols aimed at stopping Austro-Hungarian surface ships and submarines from passing through the Straits of Otranto. On 8 June, Bisson formed part of a force of four Italian destroyers and three French destroyers escorting the British light cruiser Dublin on a patrol off the Albanian coast intended to destroy Austro-Hungarian light naval forces. Despite the strong escort, the Austro-Hungarian submarine U-4 managed to torpedo Dublin, killing 13 of the British cruiser's crew, but the escort managed to drive away several more suspected submarine attacks, and Dublin successfully reached Brindisi without further damage.

On 12 July, the 6th Destroyer Flotilla, including Bisson, was part of the force that raided the island of Lastovo off the Austrian coast of the Adriatic (now part of Croatia), destroying oil stores and the telegraph station. This attack was simultaneous with the Italian occupation of Palagruža. On 5 August the Austrian submarine U-3 made an unsuccessful attack on the Italian armed merchant cruiser Citta di Catania. Several destroyers, including Bisson, were sent to intercept the Austrian submarine, and on the next morning Bisson spotted U-3 on the surface and opened fire, sinking the submarine. Twelve of U-3's crew were rescued.

==== Battle of Durazzo ====
On 29 November 1915, the Austro-Hungarian cruiser Helgoland and five destroyers attacked the port of Durazzo, Albania, where two Austro-Hungarian destroyers struck mines, with one (Lika) sinking and the second (Triglav) being taken under tow. Allied naval forces sortied from Brindisi in response, including five French destroyers (Bisson, Casque, Commandant Bory,Commandant Lucas and Renaudin), two British cruisers (Dartmouth and Weymouth), two Italian cruisers (Quarto and Nino Bixio) and four Italian destroyers. Dartmouth and the French destroyers intercepted the slowly retreating Austro-Hungarian force, with the destroyers being sent against Triglav while Dartmouth engaged Helgoland. The approach of the French destroyers forced the Austrians to scuttle Triglav, but Helgoland and the remaining Austrian destroyers managed to escape.

On 2 August 1916 Bisson, Commandant Bory and the Italian destroyers Ardito and Impavido were returning from supporting a raid by Italian MAS boats (motor torpedo boats) on Durazzo when they encountered the Austro-Hungarian destroyers Warasdiner and Wildfang, which were returning from bombarding the Italian city of Molfetta. The French and Italian destroyers set off in pursuit of the Austro-Hungarian ships, but broke off the chase as they neared the Austrian base of Cattaro (now Kotor). After turning back, the Franco-Italian force was unsuccessfully attacked by the Austro-Hungarian submarine U-4.

==== Otranto Straits ====
On the night of 14/15 May 1917, the Austro-Hungarian fleet carried out an attack on the Otranto Barrage. The cruisers Novara, Saida and Helgoland attacked the drifters of the Otranto Barrage, while the destroyers Csepel and Balaton mounted a diversionary attack against shipping off the coast of Albania. Bisson was part of a group of four Italian and French warships patrolling North of the Barrage line to protect it against attacks. (Note: The force was led by the Italian scout (or destroyer leader) Carlo Mirabello and consisted of Mirabello, Bisson, Commandant Rivière and Cimeterre.) On hearing reports of the attacks, Rear Admiral Alfredo Acton, the Allied commander, ordered Mirabello's group to steer south to intercept the Austrian forces, while more powerful forces, including the light cruisers Dartmouth and Bristol set out from Bridisi. The Mirabello group, including Bisson encountered the Austro-Hungarian cruisers on the morning of 15 May and as their guns were outranged by those of the cruisers, shadowed the Austro-Hungarian ships until more powerful forces could engage, but the slower French destroyers could not keep pace with the Austro-Hungarian ships and fell astern of Mirabello.

Bisson rescued the crew of an Italian flying boat, that had forced to ditch by engine trouble, before she, together with the rest of the Mirabello group, was ordered to join up with Dartmouth and Bristol. However, first Mirabello briefly lost power owing to contamination of fuel, then Commandant Rivière suffered engine failure. Mirabello took Commandant Rivière under tow while Bisson escorted the two ships on their voyage home.

In June 1918, in response to the threat posed by the potential seizure of ships of the Russian Black Sea Fleet by the Germans following the Treaty of Brest-Litovsk and the German advance into Ukraine, Bisson formed part of the escort for four French Pre-dreadnought battleships deployed to Mudros in the Aegean Sea.

=== Post war ===
In 1919, Bisson was deployed to the Black Sea. She was stricken in June 1933 and scrapped in 1939.

== Bibliography ==
- Corbett, Julian S. (1921). History of the Great War: Naval Operations: Volume II. London: Longmans, Green & Co.
- Couhat, Jean Labayle (1974). French Warships of World War I. London: Ian Allan. ISBN 0-7110-0445-5.
- Freivogel, Zvonimir (2019). The Great War in the Adriatic Sea 1914–1918. Zagreb: Despot Infinitus. ISBN 978-953-8218-40-8.
- Garier, Gérard (2002). L'odyssée technique et humaine du sous-marin en France [The Technical and Human Odyssey of the Submarine in France: Put to the Test by the Great War] (in French). Vol. 3, part 2: A l'épreuve de la Grande Guerre. Nantes: Marines éditions. ISBN 2-909675-81-5.
- Halpern, Paul G. (2004). The Battle of the Otranto Straits: Controlling the Gateway to the Adriatic in WWI. Bloomington, Indiana: Indiana University Press. ISBN 0-253-34379-8.
- Halpern, Paul G. (1987). The Naval War in the Mediterranean 1914–1918. Annapolis, Maryland: Naval Institute Press. ISBN 0-87021-448-9.
- Monograph No. 21: The Mediterranean 1914–1915 (PDF). Naval Staff Monographs (Historical). Vol. VIII. The Naval Staff, Training and Staff Duties Division. 1923.
- Prévoteaux, Gérard (2017). La marine française dans la Grande guerre: les combattants oubliés: Tome I 1914–1915 [The French Navy during the Great War: The Forgotten Combatants, Book I 1914–1915]. Collection Navires & Histoire des Marines du Mond. Vol. 23. Le Vigen, France: Éditions Lela presse. ISBN 978-2-37468-000-2.
- Prévoteaux, Gérard (2017). La marine française dans la Grande guerre: les combattants oubliés: Tome II 1916–1918 [The French Navy during the Great War: The Forgotten Combatants, Book II 1916–1918]. Collection Navires & Histoire des Marines du Mond. Vol. 27. Le Vigen, France: Éditions Lela presse. ISBN 978-2-37468-001-9.
- Roberts, Stephen S. (2021). French Warships in the Age of Steam 1859–1914: Design, Construction, Careers and Fates. Barnsley, UK: Seaforth Publishing. ISBN 978-1-5267-4533-0.
- Smigielski, Adam (1985). "France". In Gray, Randal (ed.). Conway's All the World's Fighting Ships 1906–1921. Annapolis, Maryland: Naval Institute Press. pp. 190–220. ISBN 0-87021-907-3.
