= Bisson-class destroyer =

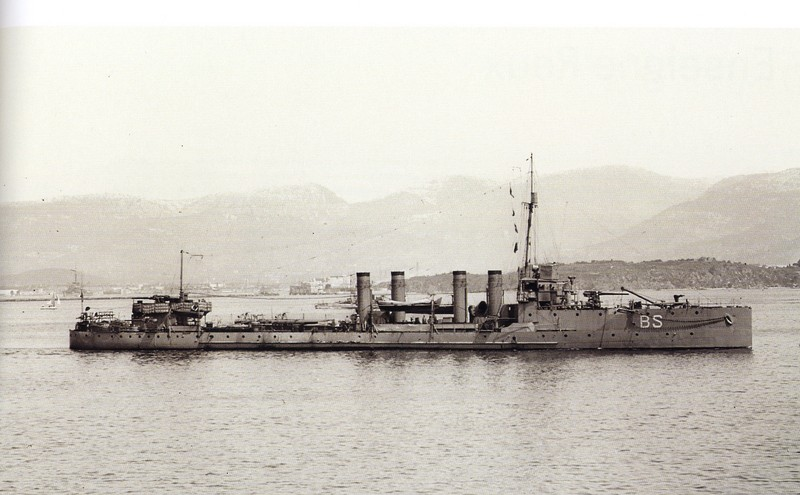
- A profile view of Bisson in harbor

Class overview
- Name: Bisson class
- Operators: French Navy
- Preceded by: Bouclier class
- Succeeded by: Enseigne Roux class
- Built: 1911–1914
- In commission: 1912–1934
- Completed: 6
- Lost: 1
- Scrapped: 5

General characteristics (as built)
- Type: Destroyer
- Displacement: 756–791 t (744–779 long tons)
- Length: 78.1 m (256 ft 3 in) (p/p)
- Beam: 8.6 m (28 ft 3 in)
- Draft: 3.1 m (10 ft 2 in)
- Installed power: 15,000 shp (11,185 kW); 4 water-tube boilers
- Propulsion: 2 shafts; 2 steam turbines
- Speed: 30 knots (56 km/h; 35 mph)
- Range: 1,950 nmi (3,610 km; 2,240 mi) at 14 knots (26 km/h; 16 mph)
- Complement: 80–83
- Armament: 2 × single 100 mm (3.9 in) guns; 4 × single 65 mm (2.6 in) guns; 2 × twin 450 mm (17.7 in) torpedo tubes

The Bisson class consisted of six destroyers built for the French Navy during the 1910s. One ship was lost during the First World War, but the others survived to be scrapped afterwards.

== Design and description ==
The Bisson class were enlarged versions of the preceding Bouclier class built to a more standardized design. The ships had a length between perpendiculars of 78.1 meters (256 ft 3 in), a beam of 8.6 meters (28 ft 3 in), and a draft of 3.1 meters (10 ft 2 in). Designed to displace 850–880 metric tons (837–866 long tons), they displaced 756–791 t (744–779 long tons) at normal load. Their crew numbered 80–83 men.

The ships were powered by a pair of steam turbines, each driving one propeller shaft using steam provided by four Indret water-tube boilers. The engines were designed to produce 15,000 shaft horsepower (11,000 kW) which was intended to give the ships a speed of 30 knots (56 km/h; 35 mph). The ships carried 164 tonnes (161 long tons) of fuel oil which gave them a range of 1,450 nautical miles (2,690 km; 1,670 mi) at cruising speeds of 14 knots (26 km/h; 16 mph).

The primary armament of the Bisson-class ships consisted of two 100-millimeter (3.9 in) Modèle 1893 guns in single mounts, one each fore and aft of the superstructure, and four 65-millimeter (2.6 in) Modèle 1902 guns distributed amidships. They were also fitted with two twin mounts for 450-millimeter (17.7 in) torpedo tubes amidships.

== Ships ==
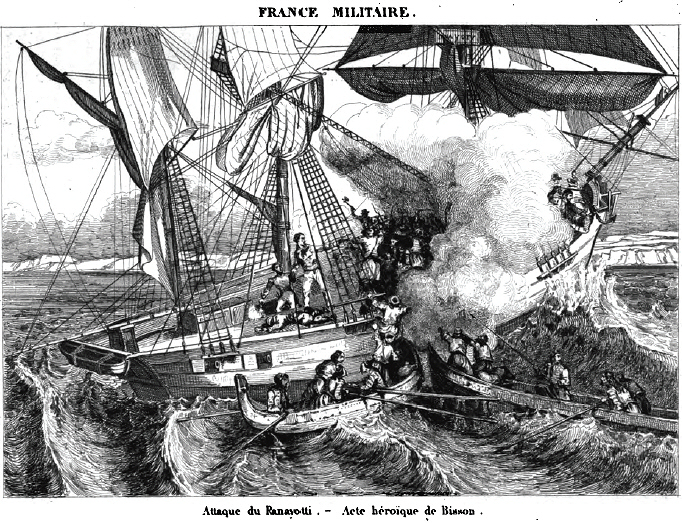
"Assault on the Panayoti. Heroic act of Bisson", circa 1838

The class is named in tribute to the French Admiral Hippolyte Bisson who sacrificed himself aboard the ship Panayoti in 1827 during the Greek War of Independence.

Name	Builder	Launched	Fate
Bisson	Arsenal de Toulon	12 September 1912	Struck, June 1933
Renaudin	Arsenal de Toulon	20 March 1913	Torpedoed and sunk by U-6 off Durazzo, 18 March 1916
Commandant Lucas	Arsenal de Toulon	11 July 1914	Struck, June 1933
Protet	Arsenal de Rochefort	15 October 1913	Struck, 1933
Mangini	Schneider et Cie, Chalon-sur-Saône	31 March 1913	Struck, 1934
Magon	Ateliers et Chantiers de Bretagne, Nantes	19 April 1913	Struck, 16 February 1926

== Service history ==
The class served primarily in the Mediterranean Sea during the First World War, with Bisson sinking the Austrian submarine U-3 on 13 August 1915 and Renaudin being sunk by U-6 in return.

== Bibliography ==
- Couhat, Jean Labayle (1974). French Warships of World War I. London: Ian Allan. ISBN 0-7110-0445-5.
- Gardiner, Robert & Gray, Randal (1985). Conway's All The World's Fighting Ships 1906–1921. London: Conway Maritime Press. ISBN 0-85177-245-5.
- Osborne, Eric W. (2005). Destroyers – An Illustrated History of Their Impact. Santa Barbara, California: ABC-Clio. ISBN 1-85109-479-2.
- Prévoteaux, Gérard (2017). La marine française dans la Grande guerre: les combattants oubliés: Tome I 1914–1915 [The French Navy during the Great War: The Forgotten Combatants, Book I 1914–1915]. Collection Navires & Histoire des Marines du Mond. Vol. 23. Le Vigen, France: Éditions Lela presse. ISBN 978-2-37468-000-2.
- Prévoteaux, Gérard (2017). La marine française dans la Grande guerre: les combattants oubliés: Tome II 1916–1918 [The French Navy during the Great War: The Forgotten Combatants, Book II 1916–1918]. Collection Navires & Histoire des Marines du Mond. Vol. 27. Le Vigen, France: Éditions Lela presse. ISBN 978-2-37468-001-9.
- Roberts, Stephen S. (2021). French Warships in the Age of Steam 1859–1914: Design, Construction, Careers and Fates. Barnsley, UK: Seaforth Publishing. ISBN 978-1-5267-4533-0.
