= Canon de 100 mm Modèle 1891 =

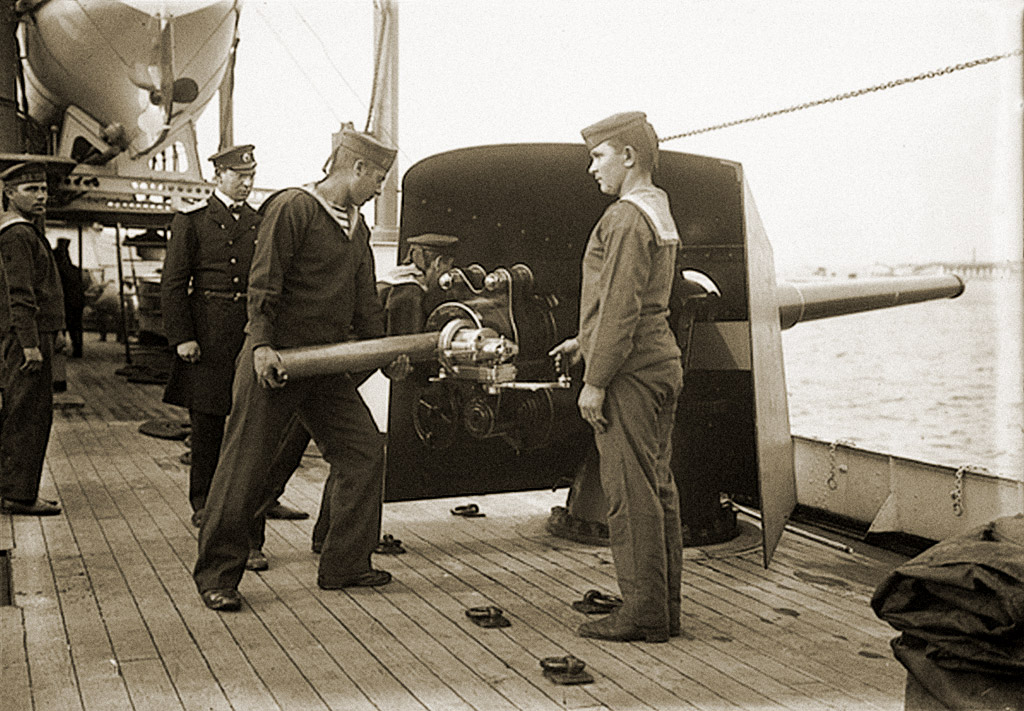
- Deck-mounted gun aboard the Bulgarian torpedo gunboat Nadezhda
- Type: Naval gun Coastal artillery Field gun
- Place of origin: France

Service history
- In service: 1891–1945
- Used by: See users
- Wars: World War I World War II

Production history
- Designer: Canet
- Designed: 1889
- Manufacturer: Schneider et Cie.
- Produced: 1891
- Variants: Modèle 1892 L/53; Modèle 1893 L/45; Modèle 1895; Modèle 1897

Specifications
- Mass: 1,700 kg (3,700 lb)
- Length: 4.6 m (15 ft 1 in)
- Barrel length: 4.4 m (14 ft 5 in); L/45 (cal)
- Shell: Fixed QF ammunition 100 x 869 mm R
- Shell weight: See ammunition
- Caliber: 100 mm (3.9 in)
- Action: Hydro-spring recuperator
- Breech: Canet screw breech
- Traverse: 360°
- Rate of fire: 10 rpm
- Muzzle velocity: 710–740 m/s (2,300–2,400 ft/s)
- Maximum firing range: 9.5 km (5.9 mi)

The Canon de 100 mm Modèle 1891 was a French naval gun developed in the late 1800s that armed a variety of warships before World War I and during World War II. In addition to its naval role it was also deployed as coastal artillery.

== History ==
The Canon de 100 mm Modèle 1891 was a French naval gun designed by the French designer Gustave Canet and produced at Schneider et Cie of Le Creusot in 1889. Five models of varying length were produced: Modèle 1891, Modèle 1892, Modèle 1893, Modèle 1895 and Modèle 1897. At some point in the guns development there was a switch from Separate loading QF ammunition to Fixed QF ammunition. However the dimensions of the guns and their performance stayed largely the same.

== Construction ==
The Modèle 1891 was constructed of an A tube, with a Canet screw breech which screwed onto the A tube. There was also a jacket and three layers of reinforcing hoops which all screwed into the breech.

== Naval Use ==
Canon de 100 mm Modèle 1891 guns armed a variety of ships such as armored cruisers, coastal defense ships, destroyers, gunboats, minesweepers, pre-dreadnought battleships, protected cruisers and seaplane tenders of the French, Bulgarian, Haitian, Polish, Portuguese, Romanian and Turkish navies.

=== Armored cruisers ===
- Gloire class - The five ships of this class had an anti-torpedo boat armament consisting of six casemated, 100 mm guns, in single mounts, amidships.
- Dupleix class - The three ships of this class had a secondary armament consisting of four 100 mm guns, in single mounts, on the forecastle deck.
- Gueydon class - The three ships of this class had an anti-torpedo boat armament consisting of four 100 mm guns, in single mounts, on the forecastle deck.

=== Coastal defense ships ===
- Bouvines class - The two ships of this class had an anti-torpedo boat armament consisting of eight 100 mm guns. Four were mounted in individual casemates. The other four were on single pivot mounts with gun shields on the shelter deck directly above the four casemated guns on the corners of the superstructure.

=== Destroyers ===
- Aventurier class - The four ships of this class had a primary armament consisting of four, 100 mm guns. One was on the forecastle, one between the funnels, and two on the quarterdeck, in front and behind the searchlight platform.
- Bisson class - The six ships of this class had a primary armament consisting of two, 100 mm guns, on single mounts, fore and aft.
- Bouclier class - The twelve ships of this class had a primary armament consisting of two, 100 mm guns, on single mounts, fore and aft.
- Enseigne Roux class - The two ships of this class had a primary armament consisting of two, 100 mm guns, on single mounts, fore and aft.

=== Gunboats ===
- Crête-à-Pierrot - This ship had a tertiary armament consisting of four, 100 mm guns, on single mounts.
- K class river gunboats - The four ships of this class had a primary armament consisting of two, shielded, 100 mm guns, on single mounts, fore and aft.
- Surprise class - The three ships of this class had a primary armament consisting of two, shielded, 100 mm guns, on single mounts, fore and aft.
- Nadezhda - This ship had a primary armament consisting of two, shielded, deck-mounted guns on single mounts.

=== Minesweepers ===
- Chamois class - The five ships of this class commissioned before World War II had a primary armament consisting of one, shielded, 100 mm gun, on a forward mount, due to shortages of the intended 100/45 M1933 guns.

=== Pre-dreadnought battleships ===
- Bouvet - This ship had an anti-torpedo boat armament consisting of eight, 100 mm guns, in single mounts, amidships.
- Charlemagne class - The three ships of this class had an anti-torpedo boat armament consisting of eight, shielded, 100 mm guns, in single mounts on the superstructure.
- Iéna - This ship had an anti-torpedo boat armament consisting of eight, shielded, 100 mm guns, in single mounts on the shelter deck.
- Masséna - This ship had an anti-torpedo boat armament consisting of eight, 100 mm guns, in single mounts, amidships.
- Suffren - This ship had an anti-torpedo boat armament consisting of eight, shielded, 100 mm guns, in single mounts, on the shelter deck and on the superstructure.

=== Protected cruisers ===
- Destrées class - The two ships of this class had a secondary armament consisting of four shielded, 100 mm guns, in sponsons, amidships.
- Linois class - The three ships of this class had a secondary armament consisting of two 100 mm guns, in single mounts.

=== Seaplane tender ===
- Foudre - This ship had a primary armament consisting of eight 100 mm guns, in single mounts.

== Coastal artillery ==
In addition to their naval role this family of guns was also used as coastal artillery by France and Poland. A number of unmodified coastal artillery guns were sent to the front during World War I where they were mounted on pedestal mounts on concrete slabs. In French service there were two main models the Canon de 100 mm Modèle 1889 T97 and Canon de 100 mm Modèle 1897 T97.

Poland had two Modèle 1891 guns in service as coastal artillery under the designation Canet 100 mm wz. 1891. The two Polish guns were purchased in March 1924 with a French loan to rearm the Polish army. They were intended to arm two ex-Russian Filin-class gunboats purchased from Finland the ORP General Haller and ORP Komendant Pilsudski. However it was found that the guns were too heavy for the ships and two Russian made Canet 75mm 50 caliber Pattern 1892 were fitted instead.

In 1932 the two guns formed the 13th coastal artillery battery was created at Oksywie to defend the approaches to the Port of Gdynia. In September 1939 the captain of the battery was Capt. Art. Antoni Ratajczyk and his deputy was Mar. Stanislaw Brychcy. One of the guns was knocked out of action on the first day of fighting, while second gun fired over a hundred rounds before being captured after 19 days of defend.

== Field artillery ==
Although the majority of combatants had long range field artillery prior to the outbreak of the First World War, none had adequate numbers of long range guns in service, nor had they foreseen the growing importance of long range artillery once the Western Front stagnated and trench warfare set in. The theorists hadn't foreseen that trenches, barbed wire, and machine guns had robbed them of the mobility they had been counting on and the combatants scrambled to find anything that could provide long range counter battery fire. This meant emptying the fortresses and scouring the depots for guns held in reserve. It also meant converting coastal artillery and naval guns by either giving them simple field carriages or mounting the larger pieces on rail carriages.

During 1914 a number guns mounted on the carriage of the Canon de 155 long modèle 1877 and the new guns were given the designation Canon de 100 mm TR mle 1897. The gun was fairly conventional for its time and most nations had similar guns such as the German 15 cm Ring Kanone L/30 which was also a converted naval gun. Like many of its contemporaries, it had a tall and narrow box trail carriage built from bolted iron plates with two wooden spoked wheels. The carriages were tall because the guns were designed to sit behind a parapet with the barrel overhanging the front. Like its contemporaries, its carriage did not have a recoil mechanism or a gun shield. However, the guns could be connected to an external recoil mechanism which connected to a steel eye on a firing platform and a hook on the carriage between the wheels. A set of wooden ramps were also placed behind the wheels and when the gun fired the wheels rolled up the ramp and was returned to position by gravity. There was also no traverse so the gun had to be levered into position to aim. A drawback of this system was the gun had to be re-aimed each time which lowered the rate of fire. The wheels could be fitted with detachable grousers designed by the Italian major Crispino Bonagente for traction on soft ground and these consisted of rectangular plates connected with elastic links and are visible in many photographs of World War I artillery from all of the combatants. For transport, the gun was broken down into two loads for towing by horse teams or artillery tractors.

When the barrels of the Canon de 100 mm TR were worn out they were rebored to fire 105 mm ammunition from the Canon de 105 mle 1913 Schneider during 1917 and the new model was called the Canon de 105 mm mle 1897. However, the new model didn't remain in service long and wasn't considered a success.

== Ammunition ==
Ammunition was fixed QF type 100 x 869 mm R . A complete cartridge weighed 24 kg (53 lb) and projectiles weighed 14–16 kg (31–35 lb).

The gun was able to fire:

- Armor Piercing
- Common

== Users ==
- France
- Bulgaria
- Haiti
- Poland
- Portugal
- Kingdom of Romania
- Ottoman Empire

== Gallery ==
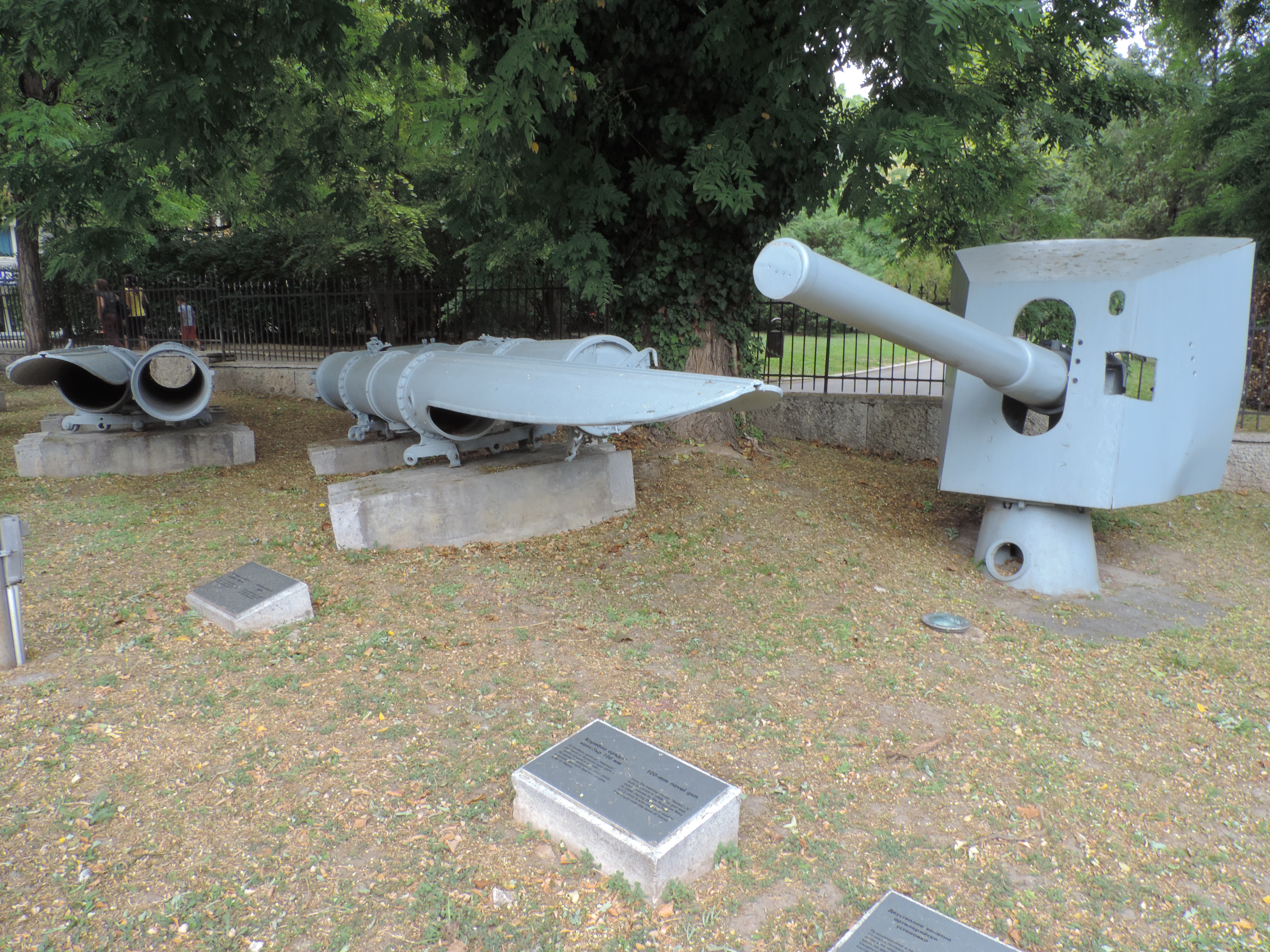
A Canon de 100 from the Nadezhda at the Naval Museum Varna Bulgaria.

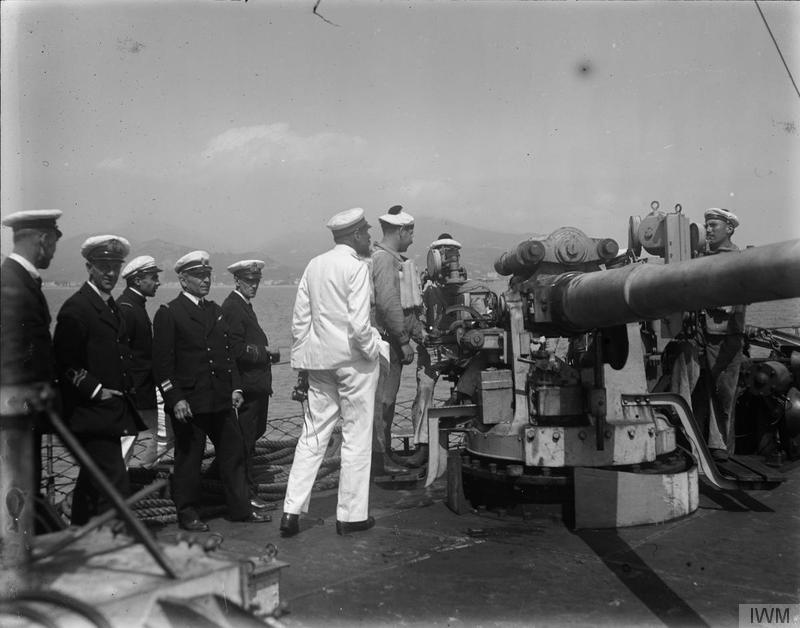
A gunnery drill aboard a French ship in the Mediterranean during World War I.

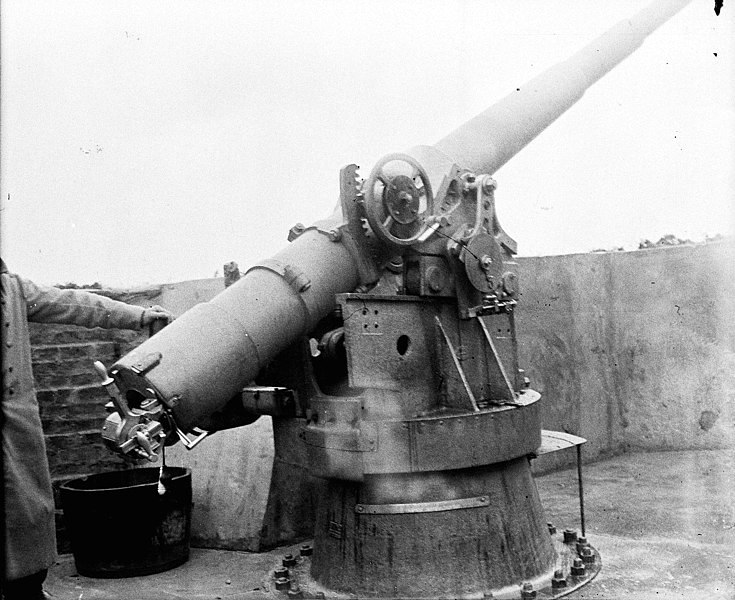
A Canon de 100 in Flanders Belgium during the First World War.

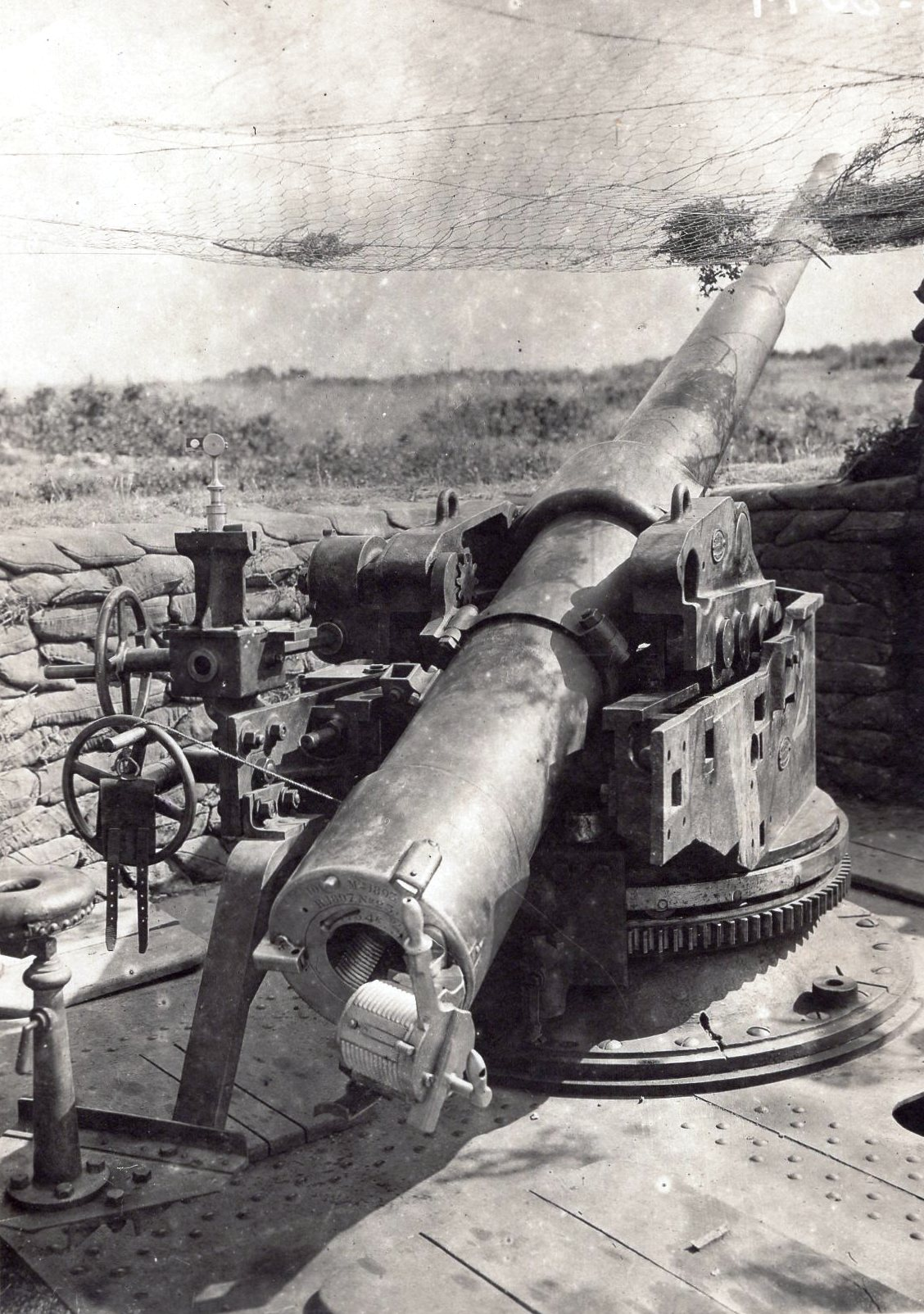
A Canon de 100 in use as a field gun.

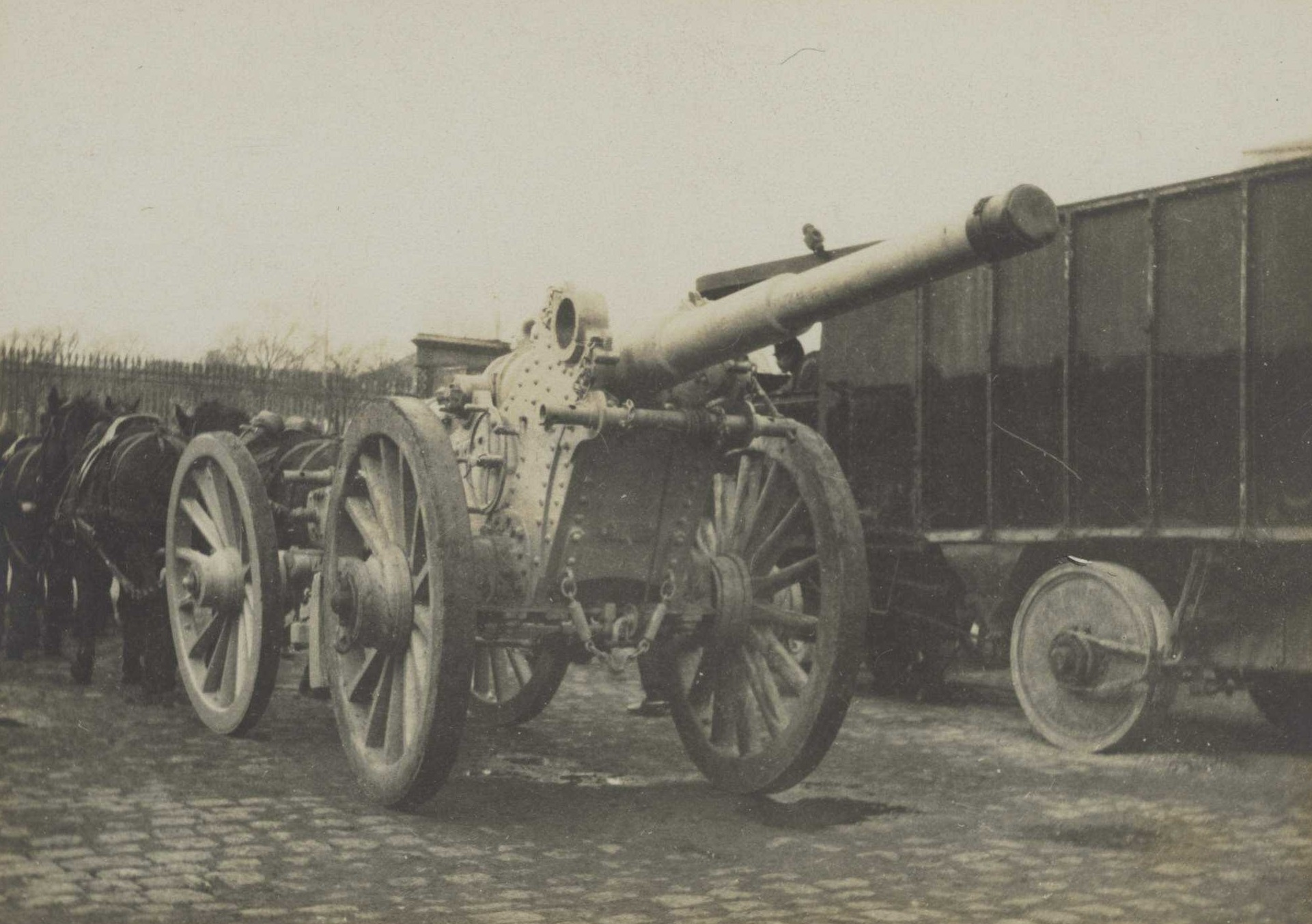
A Canon de 100 mm Modèle 1897.

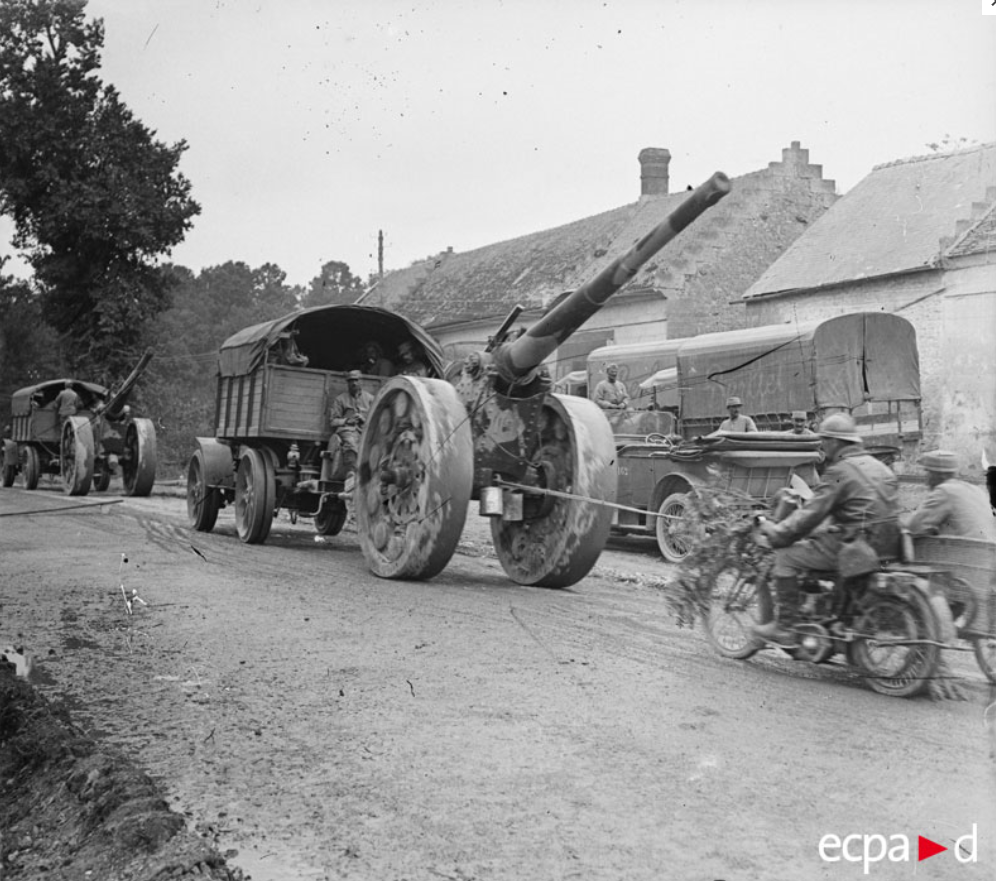
A Canon de 105 mm Modèle 1897 with elastic wheels.
