= List of ship launches in 1857 =

The list of ship launches in 1857 is a chronological list of ships launched in 1857.

| Date | Ship | Class | Builder | Location | Country | Notes |
|---|---|---|---|---|---|---|
| 1 January | Blencatura | Barque | C. Lamport | Workington | United Kingdom | For Messrs. Lamport & Holt. |
| 1 January | Jane Spiers | Barque | Messrs. Barr & Shearer | Ardrossan | United Kingdom | For Messrs. Spiers & Co. |
| 1 January | Mary Hamilton | Schooner | Messrs. Barr & Shearer | Ardrossan | United Kingdom | For Messrs. Lauchlan & Brown. |
| 10 January | Charlemagne | Clipper | Messrs. Alexander Stephen & Sons | Kelvinhaugh | United Kingdom | For Messrs. Robert Catto & Son. |
| 10 January | Nile | Paddle steamer | Josiah Jones Jr. | Liverpool | United Kingdom | For Messrs. G. Forester & Co. |
| 10 January | Sphinx | Paddle steamer | Josiah Jones Jr. | Liverpool | United Kingdom | For Messrs. G. Forester & Co. |
| 12 January | Adelaide | Full-rigged ship | Henry Harvey Jr. | Emsworth | United Kingdom | For Messrs. Kay. |
| 12 January | Mary | Schooner | | Bombay | India | For British East India Company. |
| 27 January | Kamehameha IV | Full-rigged ship | Harrington and Workington Shipbuilding and Ropemaking Co. | Workington | United Kingdom | For Messrs. Bushby & Co. |
| 14 January | Polar Star | Barque | Messrs. Stephen & Forbes | Peterhead | United Kingdom | For William Mitchell and others. |
| 19 January | Star of the North | Clipper | William Pile Jr. | Monkwearmouth | United Kingdom | For George Leslie. |
| 27 January | Mallard | Full-rigged ship | Messrs. L. Kennedy & Co. | Whitehaven | United Kingdom | For Joseph Mondel. |
| 28 January | Morning Star | Full-rigged ship | Messrs. Willmett | Bristol | United Kingdom | For Messrs. Knapp & Besley. |
| 28 January | Yarborough | Steamship | Messrs. Samuelson | Hull | United Kingdom | For private owner. |
| 29 January | Caledonia | Steamship | Messrs. Laurence Hill & Co. | Port Glasgow | United Kingdom | For private owner. |
| 29 January | Ely | Paddle steamer | Messrs. Scott & Co. | Cartsdyke | United Kingdom | For Bristol General Steam Navigation Company. |
| January | Carl | Clipper | | | United Kingdom | For private owner. |
| January | Gondola | Clipper | Thomas Bilbe & Co. | Rotherhithe | United Kingdom | For private owner. |
| 4 February | Bristol Packet | Merchantman | Messrs. Cook | River Usk | United Kingdom | For Messrs. Burton. |
| 4 February | Crimea | Steamship | Messrs. Napier | River Clyde | United Kingdom | For Messrs. Lewis, Potter, & Co. |
| 5 February | Pelorus | Pearl-class corvette | | Devonport Dockyard | United Kingdom | For Royal Navy. |
| 9 February | Damascus | Clipper | Messrs. Walter Hood & Co. | Aberdeen | United Kingdom | For Messrs. George Thompson Jr. & Co. |
| 10 February | Friar Tuck | Clipper | Messrs. Hall & Sons | Footdee | United Kingdom | For James Beasley. |
| 10 February | Harbinger | Tug | Messrs. Westwood, Bailie, Campbell & Co. | Poplar | United Kingdom | For Thames Steam Tug and Lighterage Company. |
| 11 February | Caroline | Schooner | Messrs. Parkinson | Hull | United Kingdom | For private owner. |
| 11 February | Emma Colley | Schooner | Messrs. Spencer & Gardam | Hull | United Kingdom | For Jacob Colley. |
| 11 February | Kingston | Barque | Messrs. Hallett | Hull | United Kingdom | For Messrs. Hallett. |
| 12 February | The Tees | Steamship | Messrs. Pearse, Lockwood & Co. | Stockton-on-Tees | United Kingdom | For Stockton Steam Ship Company. |
| 13 February | Duke of Rothesay | Steamship | Messrs. William Denny & Brothers | Dumbarton | United Kingdom | For Aberdeen Steam Navigation Company. |
| 14 February | Clifton | Steamship | Messrs. Stothert & Co. | Hotwells | United Kingdom | For Messrs. J. Edwards & Co. |
| 17 February | Caduceus | Barque | John Davison | Sunderland | United Kingdom | For Edmund H. Hogg. |
| 23 February | Algernon Percy | Barque | J. Davison | Sheepfolds | United Kingdom | For George Shotton. |
| 24 February | Berenguela | Petronila-class screw frigate | Reales Astilleros de Esteiro | Ferrol | Spain | For Spanish Navy. |
| 24 February | Orissa | Barque | Messrs. Wood, Spence & Co | Deptford | United Kingdom | For Messrs. J. Rodham & Co. |
| 24 February | The Maid of Anglesey | Schooner | | Gallows Point | United Kingdom | For private owner. |
| 25 February | Cuba Packet | Steamship | Alexander Denny | Dumbarton | United Kingdom | For Messrs. Frederick Smelt & Son. |
| 25 February | John Scott | Full-rigged ship | Shevill | Southwick | United Kingdom | For Messrs. Bradley & Potts. |
| 25 February | Livingstone | Full-rigged ship | Peter Austin | Panns | United Kingdom | For Messrs. Pow & Faucas. |
| 25 February | The Spirit of the Age | Barque | John Westacott | Barnstaple | United Kingdom | For Mr. Crisp. |
| 26 February | Bolivia | Clipper | Messrs. Kennedy & Co. | Whitehaven | United Kingdom | For Messrs. Nicholson & McGill. |
| 26 February | Princess Royal | Paddle steamer | Messrs. Tod & MacGregor | Partick | United Kingdom | For private owner. |
| 26 February | Suffolk | Full-rigged ship | Money Wigram | Northam | United Kingdom | For private owner. |
| 27 February | Petronila | Screw frigate | Arsenal de Cartagena | Cartagena | Spain | For Spanish Navy. |
| 28 February | Matanzas | Barque | Messrs. John Scott & Sons | Greenock | United Kingdom | For John Kerr. |
| February | Red Deer | Schooner | James Mayn | Falmouth | United Kingdom | For Messrs. E. Pope & Co. |
| 7 March | Jaseur | Algerine-class gunboat | R. & H. Green | Blackwall | United Kingdom | For Royal Navy |
| 12 March | St. Petersburg | Steamship | Messrs. Denny & Rankin | Dumbarton | United Kingdom | For Messrs. M'Nab & Clark. |
| 12 March | Windsor Castle | Full-rigged ship | William Pile | Sunderland | United Kingdom | For Greens Blackwall Line. |
| 14 March | Neptune | Steamship | Young, Son & Magnay | Limehouse | United Kingdom | For Österreichischer Lloyd. |
| 14 March | Winchester | Dredger | | Bombay | India | For British East India Company. |
| 18 March | Jasper | Algerine-class gunboat | R. & N. Green | Blackwall | United Kingdom | For Royal Navy. |
| 18 March | Slaney | Algerine-class gunboat | | | United Kingdom | For Royal Navy. |
| 22 March | Minnehaha | Medium clipper | Donald McKay | East Boston, Massachusetts | United States | For private owner. |
| 24 March | Lady Canning | Sloop of war | | Bombay | India | For British East India Company. |
| 25 March | Daylight | Barque | James Laing | Sunderland | United Kingdom | For Hastie & Co. |
| 25 March | Doris | Diadem-class frigate | | Pembroke Dockyard | United Kingdom | For Royal Navy. |
| 27 March | Alexandre | Suffren-class ship of the line | | Rochefort | France | For French Navy. |
| 27 March | Lauriston | Barque | Woods, Spence & Co. | Sunderland | United Kingdom | For Andrew Anderson. |
| 27 March | Margaret Jane | Schooner | James Owen | Nefyn | United Kingdom | For private owner. |
| 28 March | Grimsby | Steamship | Messrs. Samuelson & Co. | Hull | United Kingdom | For private owner. |
| 28 March | Renown | Renown-class ship of the line | | Chatham Dockyard | United Kingdom | For Royal Navy. |
| March | Planter | Clipper | Green | Grimsby | United Kingdom | For private owner. |
| 2 April | Oak | Schooner | Messrs. Hall | Aberdeen | United Kingdom | For R. Johnston. |
| 7 April | Anna Paulowna | Steamship | William Denny and Brothers | Dumbarton | United Kingdom | For Koninklijke Nederlandse Stoomboot-Maatschappij. |
| 9 April | Armenian | Steamship | Messrs. Richardson Bros. | Hartlepool | United Kingdom | Drove ashore on launch and was damaged. |
| 9 April | Groningen | Groningen-class corvette | Fop Smit | Kinderdijk | Netherlands | For Royal Netherlands Navy. |
| 9 April | William and Sarah Ann | Schooner | Richard Cliffe | Castleford | United Kingdom | For private owner. |
| 10 April | Orient | Steamship | Messrs. J. W. Hoby & Co. | Renfrew | United Kingdom | For Messrs. H. W. Lange & Co. |
| 16 April | Leeds | Schooner | James Wake | Goole | United Kingdom | For Messrs. William France, Silva & Co. |
| 23 April | Amble | Brig | Messrs. Sanderson & Leighton | Amble | United Kingdom | For private owners. |
| 25 April | Anne | Steam yacht | Messrs. Andrew Ogle & Co. | Preston | United Kingdom | For Jonathan Grindrod. |
| 25 April | Ann Staniland | Brig | Waley | Thorne | United Kingdom | For William Staniland. |
| 25 April | Bogota | Full-rigged ship | Messrs. Andrew Ogle & Co. | Preston | United Kingdom | For Messrs. Blythe & Troughton. |
| 25 April | Coyne | Steamship | Messrs. Brassey, Peto & Co. | Birkenhead | United Kingdom | For John Hastie. |
| 25 April | Idwal | Schooner | Edward Ellis | Garth | United Kingdom | For private owner. |
| 25 April | Latona | Barque | Bowman and Drummond | Blyth | United Kingdom | For W., R. & T Smith. |
| 25 April | Racoon | Pearl-class corvette | | Chatham Dockyard | United Kingdom | For Royal Navy. |
| 25 April | Royal Sovereign | First rate ship of the line | | Portsmouth Dockyard | United Kingdom | For Royal Navy. |
| 25 April | Sylphide | Yacht | Daniel Robinson Jr. | Gosport | United Kingdom | For Mr. Peters. |
| 25 April | W. W. Smith | Clipper | F. C. Clarke | Jersey | Jersey | For Messrs. J. J. Melhuish & Co. |
| 26 April | Quirinal | Steamship | | Toulon | France | For Imperial Russian Navy. |
| 27 April | Akyab | Clipper | | Nantes | France | For J. T. Barbey et Cie. |
| 27 April | Day Spring | Steamship | John Laird | Birkenhead | United Kingdom | For British Government. |
| 27 April | George Washington | Full-rigged ship | Wright | Aberdeen | United Kingdom | For private owner. |
| 27 April | Lord Ashley | Steamship | Messrs. Samuelson & Co. | Hull | United Kingdom | For Messrs. Z. C. Pearson, Coleman & Co. |
| 27 April | Rio Grande | Clipper | | Nantes | France | For J. T. Barbey et Cie. |
| 29 April | William Carvill | Full-rigged ship | Thomas M'Williams | Straight Shore | (United Kingdom of Great Britain and Ireland) Colony of New Brunswick | For private owner. |
| 30 April | Henry Bell | Steamship | T. B. Seath | Rutherglen | United Kingdom | For Messrs. James Steel & Sons. |
| April | Morning News | Barque | Messrs. Pots & Sons | Saint John | (United Kingdom of Great Britain and Ireland) Colony of New Brunswick | For private owner. |
| April | Phoebus | Barque | William Reed | Sunderland | United Kingdom | For Mr. Smallman. |
| April | Queen of the Pacific | Paddle steamer | Westervelt & Co. | New York | United States | For Morgan & Garrison. |
| 7 May | May Queen | Steam yacht | Charles Slight | New Holland | United Kingdom | For William Hart. |
| 9 May | Atlantic | Steamship | Messrs. Earle | Hull | United Kingdom | For Messrs. Thomas Wilson, Sons, & Co. |
| 11 May | Firefly | Steam yacht | Messrs. J. & R. White | Cowes | United Kingdom | For Henry Oglander. |
| 12 May | Neva | Steamship | Messrs. William Simons & Co. | Whiteinch | United Kingdom | For private owner. |
| 13 May | Petronila | Screw frigate | | Cartagena | Spain | For Spanish Navy. |
| 14 May | Her Majesty | Brig | Henry Harvey | Littlehampton | United Kingdom | For private owner. |
| 18 May | Duncan Dunbar | Clipper | James Laing | Sunderland | United Kingdom | For Gellatly, Hankey & Sewell. |
| 21 May | Stour | Sailing barge | | Harwich Dockyard | United Kingdom | For private owner. |
| 23 May | Edyth Byrne | Full-rigged ship | Messrs. Brassey, Peto & Co. | Birkenhead | United Kingdom | For Messrs. A. and E. Byrne. |
| 23 May | Mayflower | Yacht | Messrs. Brassey, Peto & Co. | Birkenhead | United Kingdom | For George Harrison. |
| 23 May | Transatlantic | Clipper | Messrs. Walter Hood & Co. | Aberdeen | United Kingdom | For George Thompson Jr. & Co. |
| 23 May | William Corey | Collier | Messrs. Charles Mitchell & Sons | Low Walker | United Kingdom | For William Corey, John Nixon & Hugh Taylor. |
| 25 May | Celia | Schooner | Messrs. Bayley & Sons | Ipswich | United Kingdom | For Messrs. Williams & Co. |
| 25 May | Earl of Ellesmere | Tug | Messrs. A. Ogle & Co. | Preston | United Kingdom | For Trustees of the Duke of Bridgwater. |
| 25 May | Lady Brisbane | Schooner | Messrs. J. Brisbane Jr. & Co. | Birkenhead | United Kingdom | For private owner. |
| 25 May | Ardente | Frigate | | Brest | France | For French Navy. |
| 25 May | Philanthropist | Schooner | J. Roberts | Holyhead | United Kingdom | For private owner. |
| 26 May | Adriatic | Barque | | Hillsborough | (United Kingdom of Great Britain and Ireland) Colony of New Brunswick | For private owner. |
| 26 May | Ems | Steamship | Messrs. Samuelson | Hull | United Kingdom | For private owner. |
| 26 May | Wave | Paddle steamer | Messrs. Samuelson | Hull | United Kingdom | For private owner. |
| 30 May | Dione | Barque | Henry Claughton | Bristol | United Kingdom | For Messrs. Gordon Bros. |
| May | Chowan | Steamship | John K. Kirkham | Murfreesboro, North Carolina | United States | For North Carolina and New York Steamship Co. |
| May | Grace Vernon | Merchantman | | Quebec City | (United Kingdom of Great Britain and Ireland) Province of Canada | Capsized on launch. Righted and found to be severely hogged. |
| May | Milton Lockhart | Clipper | | Quebec | (United Kingdom of Great Britain and Ireland) Province of Canada | For private owner. |
| May | Sisters | Schooner | Robert Thompson & Sons | Sunderland | United Kingdom | For James Hall. |
| May | Gisela | Steamship | | Danube | Austrian Empire | For private owner. |
| May | Sophie | Steamship | | Danube | Austrian Empire | For private owner. |
| 6 June | Oyapoque | Paddle steamer | Messrs. Robert Steele & Co. | Greenock | United Kingdom | For Brazilian Steampacket Company. |
| 8 June | Lord Worsley | Steamship | Messrs. Samuelson | Hull | United Kingdom | For Messrs. Pearson, Coleman & Co. |
| 9 June | Not named | Brig | Messrs. G. Milne & Co. | Aberdeen | United Kingdom | For private owner. |
| 10 June | Australasian | Steamship | Messrs. J. & G. Thomson | Clydebank | United Kingdom | For European and Australasian Company. |
| 18 June | Minerva | Merchantman | Hazzlehurst | Hull | United Kingdom | For John Crosskill. |
| 20 June | Sir Jamsetjee Jeejeeboy | Barque | Belfast Iron-Ship-Building Company | Belfast | United Kingdom | For private owner. |
| 22 June | Abbey Craig | Full-rigged ship | | Richibucto | (United Kingdom of Great Britain and Ireland) Colony of New Brunswick | For private owner. |
| 23 June | Austria | Steamship | Caird & Company | Greenock | United Kingdom | For Hamburg America Line. |
| 23 June | Fylde | Schooner | | Fleetwood | United Kingdom | For private owner. |
| 23 June | Nancy Riley | Steamship | Messrs. A. Leslie & Co. | Newcastle upon Tyne | United Kingdom | For private owner. |
| 23 June | Robert Burns | Steamship | T. B. Seath | Rutherglen | United Kingdom | For private owner. |
| 23 June | Secret | Fishing smack | Messrs. Gibson & Butcher | Fleetwood | United Kingdom | For Messrs. William and Richard Leadbetter. |
| 24 June | Norseman | Steam yacht | Messrs. Tod & MacGregor | Greenock | United Kingdom | For Arthur Anderson. |
| 25 June | Baltic | Schooner | Robert Jones | Voryd | United Kingdom | For private owner. |
| June | Anne | Snow | Sykes & Co. | Sunderland | United Kingdom | For Robert Harrowing. |
| June | Briseis | Barque | Thomas Lightfoot | Sunderland | United Kingdom | For R. H. Bamfield & Co. |
| June | Florence Nightingale | Barque | | Hopewell | (United Kingdom of Great Britain and Ireland) Colony of New Brunswick | For private owner. |
| June | Governor | Barque | Richard Wilkinson | Pallion | United Kingdom | For George Thomson. |
| June | Ilia-Morometz | Frigate | | Arkhangelsk | Russia | For Imperial Russian Navy. |
| June | Iris | Brig | | Tignish | (United Kingdom of Great Britain and Ireland) Colony of New Brunswick | For private owner. |
| June | Sevre | Transport ship | | Nantes | France | For French Navy. |
| June | Maid of the Mist | Clipper | | Quebec | (United Kingdom of Great Britain and Ireland) Province of Canada | For private owner. |
| June | Mary Ann | Brigantine | | Saint John | (United Kingdom of Great Britain and Ireland) Colony of New Brunswick | For private owner. |
| 4 July | C. J. Kershaw | Barque | | Cleveland, Ohio | United States | For private owner. |
| 4 July | Mayflower | 4 July | John T. Alcock | Sunderland | United Kingdom | For Mr. Matthews. |
| 7 July | Unnamed | Steamship | | Athlone | United Kingdom | For Midland Great Western Railway. |
| 9 July | Tyburnia | Full-rigged ship | Messrs. Alexander Stephen & Sons | Kelvinhaugh | United Kingdom | For Messrs. Somes Bros. |
| 15 July | Profit and Loss | Schooner | Robert Thomas | Nefyn | United Kingdom | For private owner. |
| 22 July | Eagle | Steamship | Messrs. Alexander Denny & Sons | Dumbarton | United Kingdom | For M'Connell & Laird. |
| 22 July | Resolute | Tug | Messrs. Hoby & Co. | Renfrew | United Kingdom | For Liverpool New Steam-Tug Company (limited). |
| 23 July | Delhi | Steamship | Messrs. Tod & MacGregor | Partick | United Kingdom | For Peninsular and Oriental Steam Navigation Company. |
| 23 July | George & Emily | Barque | Bowman and Drummond | Blyth | United Kingdom | For R. Soulsby & Co. |
| 23 July | Kinaldie | Clipper | Messrs. Milne & Co. | Aberdeen | United Kingdom | For George Milne. |
| 23 July | Vigilant | Steamship | Messrs. Samuelson | Hull | United Kingdom | For private owner. |
| 24 July | Royal Burgh | Steamboat | Seath | Rutherglen | United Kingdom | For private owner. |
| 25 July | Agenoria | Steamship | Messrs. Brassey, Peto & Co. | Birkenhead | United Kingdom | For J. Jones. |
| 25 July | Elizabeth Aaron | Schooner | Pearson | Goole | United Kingdom | For private owner. |
| 25 July | Grenada | Steamship | Messrs. Summers & Co. | Northam | United Kingdom | For Peninsular and Oriental Steam Navigation Company. |
| 30 July | Ida | Brig | | Digby | (United Kingdom of Great Britain and Ireland) Colony of Nova Scotia | For private owner. |
| July | J. P. Taylor | Schooner | | "Moneton" | (United Kingdom of Great Britain and Ireland) Colony of New Brunswick | For private owner. |
| July | L'Empereur | Steamship | | Cork | United Kingdom | For private owner. |
| July | Oshawa | Full-rigged ship | | Quebec | (United Kingdom of Great Britain and Ireland) Province of Canada | For private owner. |
| July | Sparta | Brigantine | | | (United Kingdom of Great Britain and Ireland) Colony of Prince Edward Island | For private owner. |
| July | William | Barque | Thomas Stonehouse | Low Southwick | United Kingdom | For Thomas Crozier. |
| 4 August | Cupid | Cutter | Harvey | Littlehampton | United Kingdom | For North Sea Fisheries Co. |
| 6 August | North Star | Yacht | Messrs. Brassey & Peto | Birkenhead | United Kingdom | For Mr. Harrison. |
| 8 August | Chiloe | Clipper | Josiah Jones Jr. | Liverpool | United Kingdom | For Messrs. Gardner, Broomhall & Co. |
| 8 August | Emmeline | BRigantine | Messrs. R. & J. Evans | Liverpool | United Kingdom | For P. H. Dean. |
| 8 August | Melpomene | Emerald-class frigate | | Pembroke Dockyard | United Kingdom | For Royal Navy. |
| 8 August | Woodbine | Barque | Watson | Banff | United Kingdom | For private owner. |
| 10 August | Jem | Schooner | Alex Connell | Belfast | United Kingdom | For private owner. |
| 19 August | Medina | Clipper | Messrs. John & Robert White | Cowes | United Kingdom | For James Shephard. |
| 19 August | Zoe Treffry | Schooner | G. W. & W. J. Hall | Monkwearmouth | United Kingdom | For Mr. Treffry. |
| 20 August | Osborne | Barque | Messrs. Hopper | Newcastle upon Tyne | United Kingdom | For F. Dale. |
| 21 August | Moy | Tug | Messrs. M'Laine & Sons | Belfast | United Kingdom | For private owner. |
| 21 August | Saxonia | Steamship | Messrs. Caird & Co. | Greenock | United Kingdom | For Hamburg and American Steam Packet Company. |
| 22 August | Agricola | Brig | Messrs. A. Hall & Co. | Aberdeen | United Kingdom | For Northern Agricultural Co. |
| 29 August | Rosetta | Barque | Belfast Ship-Building Company | Belfast | United Kingdom | For private owner. |
| August | Art-Union | Full-rigged ship | Bradley & Briggs | Sunderland | United Kingdom | For Mr. Shepherd. |
| August | Ellen Morrison | Barque | | Sunderland | United Kingdom | For Robert Morrison Jr. |
| August | Emerald Isle | Barque | | | (United Kingdom of Great Britain and Ireland) Colony of New Brunswick | For private owner. |
| August | Explorer | Sternwheeler | Reaney, Neafie & Co. | Philadelphia, Pennsylvania | United States | For Joseph Christmas Ives. |
| August | Segeta | Snow | Bowman and Drummond | Blyth | United Kingdom | For Wilson & Co. |
| August | Weardale | Merchantman | John Robinson | Sunderland | United Kingdom | For Mr. Smurthwaite. |
| August | Zeno | Barque | Austin & Mills | Sunderland | United Kingdom | For Thomas Humble. |
| 5 September | Canadian | Merchantman | Messrs. John Scott & Sons | Greenock | United Kingdom | For William Orr. |
| 5 September | Crinoline | Schooner | Scott | Inverkeithing | United Kingdom | For Messrs. Wylde & Co. |
| 5 September | Leopard | Paddle steamer | Messrs. William Denny & Bros. | Dumbarton | United Kingdom | For Messrs. G. & J. Burns. |
| 5 September | Robert Henderson | Clipper | William Duthie Jr. | Aberdeen | United Kingdom | For Patrick Henderson & Co. |
| 8 September | Elk | Sternwheeler | C. E. Sweitzer | Canemah, Oregon | United States | For Pease, Matthieu and others. |
| 8 September | Malta | Full-rigged ship | | Saint John | (United Kingdom of Great Britain and Ireland) Colony of New Brunswick | For private owner. |
| 9 September | Grille | Aviso | Chantiers et Ateliers Augustin Normand | Havre de Grâce | France | For Prussian Navy. |
| 10 September | March Hare | Schooner | | Truro | United Kingdom | For private owner. |
| 17 September | Admella | Steamship | Messrs. Lawrence Hill & Co. | Port Glasgow | United Kingdom | For Melbourne & Adelaide Steam-ship Company. |
| 18 September | Lightning | Schooner | Messrs. Stephen & Forbes | Peterhead | United Kingdom | For private owner. |
| 19 September | Agia Sophia | Steamship | Messrs. J. & G. Thompson | Clydebank | United Kingdom | For Messrs. Papayanni & Mussabini. |
| 19 September | Artisan | clipper | Messrs. A. Hall & Co. | Aberdeen | United Kingdom | For Messrs. A. Hall & Co. |
| 21 September | City of Bangor | Schooner | John Roberts | Hirael | United Kingdom | For Meshach Roberts and others. |
| 23 September | Falk | Steamship | Messrs. C. & W. Earle | Hull | United Kingdom | For private owner. |
| September | Nanette | Barque | | | United Kingdom | For private owner. |
| 1 October | Contest | Steamship | Messrs. William Simons & Co. | Whiteinch | United Kingdom | For private owner. |
| 3 October | Brother Jonathan | tug | Messrs. Andrew Ogle & Co. | Preston | United Kingdom | For United Steam-tug Company. |
| 3 October | No. 2 | Dredger | | Bombay | India | For British East India Company. |
| 5 October | Jane and Ellen | Schooner | McMurdy | Lytham | United Kingdom | For John Bond & John Ward. |
| 5 October | Rescue | Paddle tug | Liverpool Steam-tug Company | Liverpool | United Kingdom | For Liverpool Steam-tug Company. |
| 5 October | Roseneath | Full-rigged ship | Messrs Barclay & Curle | Broomielaw | United Kingdom | For Messrs. William Kidston & Sons. |
| 6 October | Charles Green | Schooner | H. Follett | Shaldon | United Kingdom | For Messrs. Green & Co. |
| 6 October | Twilight | Medium clipper | Charles Mallory | Mystic, Connecticut | United States | For Gates & Co. |
| 20 October | Duchess of Argyle | Steamship | Messrs Napier, Glasgow | Athlone | United Kingdom | Built at Glasgow, dismantled and re-erected for launch. For Midland Great Western Railway. |
| 20 October | Retreiver | Tug | Messrs. J. W. Hoby & Co. | Renfrew | United Kingdom | For Liverpool New Steam Tug Company. |
| 21 October | Condor | Steamship | Messrs. Earle | Hull | United Kingdom | For private owner. |
| 21 October | Elizabeth | Schooner | | Lowestoft | United Kingdom | For private owner. |
| 29 October | Tsesarevich | First rate ship of the line | Nikolaev Admiralty shipyard | Nikolaieff | Russia | For Imperial Russian Navy. |
| October | Orion | Barque | Messrs. Mathias & Richards | Mostyn | United Kingdom | For private owner. |
| October | Princess Joinville | Steamship | Caird and Company | Greenock | United Kingdom | For Hamburg Brazilianische Packetschiffahrt Gesellschaft. |
| October | Rover | Tug | Messrs. Blackwood & Gordon | Paisley | United Kingdom | For New Steam Tug Company (limited). |
| 2 November | Esk | Steamship | Jackson | South Shields | United Kingdom | For Whitby and Robin Hood's Bay Steam Packet Company. |
| 2 November | Victor | Intrepid-class gunvessel | Money Wigram & Son | Blackwall | United Kingdom | For Royal Navy. |
| 3 November | Ceylon | Full-rigged ship | Thomas Smith & J. Rutherford | Preston | United Kingdom | For Ribble Navigation Company. |
| 4 November | Racer | Racer-class sloop | | Deptford Dockyard | United Kingdom | For Royal Navy. |
| 11 November | Emily | Merchantman | Messrs. Row Bros. | Topsham | United Kingdom | For private owner. |
| 15 November | Unnamed | Corvette | William H. Webb | New York | United States | For Imperial Russian Navy. |
| 17 November | Princesa de Asturias | Screw frigate | Arsenal de La Carraca | San Fernando | Spain | For Spanish Navy. |
| 19 November | Blanche | Steamship | Messrs. Samuelson's | Hull | United Kingdom | For private owner. |
| 20 November | Five Brothers | Steamship | Messrs. Thomas Wingate & Co. | Whiteinch | United Kingdom | For Messrs. Eng, Wat, Goh, Guan & Bros. |
| 28 November | Leith | Steamship | Messrs. J. & R. Swan | Maryhill | United Kingdom | For London, Leith & Granton Shipping Co. |
| November | Concordia | Corvette | Arsenal de la Carraca | San Fernando | United Kingdom | For Spanish Navy. |
| November | Gem | Brigantine | | Tatmagouche | (United Kingdom of Great Britain and Ireland) Colony of New Brunswick | For private owner. |
| November | Narvaez | Corvette | | Ferrol | Spain | For Spanish Navy. |
| November | Rachael | Clipper | Peverall & Davison | Sunderland | United Kingdom | For private owner. |
| November | Star of Temperance | Humber Keel | | | United Kingdom | For private owner. |
| 1 December | The Twin Sister | Schooner | | Wexford | United Kingdom | For private owner. |
| 2 December | Gannet | Racer-class sloop | | Pembroke Dockyard | United Kingdom | For Royal Navy. |
| 3 December | Haliç | Steamboat | Messrs. John & Robert White | Cowes | United Kingdom | For Ottoman Navy. |
| 3 December | Tatlı Sular | Steamboat | Messrs. John & Robert White | Cowes | United Kingdom | For Ottoman Navy. |
| 10 December | Huntsville | Steamship | Jacob Aaron Westervelt | New York | United States | For H. B. Cromwell & Co. |
| 15 December | Oudaloy | Steamship | Messrs. Charles Mitchell & Co. | Low Walker | United Kingdom | For Russian Steam Navigation Company. |
| 17 December | Fantaisie | Royal Yacht | Thames Iron Works | Blackwall | United Kingdom | For Franz Joseph I of Austria. |
| 17 December | Pausilippe | Steamship | | La Ciotat | France | For Compagnie des Messageries Imperiales. |
| 30 December | Duchess | Steamship | Messrs. Andrew Leslie & Co. | Newcastle upon Tyne | United Kingdom | For Lancaster and Liverpool Steam Company. |
| December | Adria Dorica | Full-rigged ship | | Ancona | Papal States | For private owner. |
| December | Charles Adams | Brigantine | | Maitland | (United Kingdom of Great Britain and Ireland) Colony of Nova Scotia | For private owner. |
| Spring | Jura | Full-rigged ship | | Quebec | (United Kingdom of Great Britain and Ireland) Province of Canada | For private owner. |
| Summer | Iona | Full-rigged ship | | Quebec | (United Kingdom of Great Britain and Ireland) Province of Canada | For private owner. |
| Autumn | Pladda | Full-rigged ship | | Quebec | (United Kingdom of Great Britain and Ireland) Province of Canada | For private owner. |
| Unknown date | Aaron V. Brown | Schooner | Merry and Grey | Milan, Ohio | United States | For United States Revenue Cutter Service. |
| Unknown date | A. Child | Paddle steamer | | Jeffersonville, Indiana | United States | For private owner. |
| Unknown date | Ada | Snow | | Sunderland | United Kingdom | For C. Allcock. |
| Unknown date | Adelicia | Barque | C. W. Crown | Sunderland | United Kingdom | For H. & B. Craven. |
| Unknown date | Adrien | Barque | W. H. Pearson | Sunderland | United Kingdom | For James Lancaster, Stephen W. Rackley, Thomas J. Reay and John Smurthwaite. |
| Unknown date | Affiance | Barque | James Robinson | Sunderland | United Kingdom | For private owner. |
| Unknown date | Alciope | Barque | J. T. Alcock | Sunderland | United Kingdom | For Potts & Co. |
| Unknown date | Alcyone | Barque | Brown & Johnson | Sunderland | United Kingdom | For T. Todd. |
| Unknown date | Alice | Barque | Peverall & Davison | Sunderland | United Kingdom | For Brodie & Co. |
| Unknown date | Alice Hawthorn | Barque | | | United Kingdom | For private owner. |
| Unknown date | Annie Lawson | Merchantman | Pickersgill & Miller | Sunderland | United Kingdom | For private owner. |
| Unknown date | A. O. Tyler | Paddle steamer | | Cincinnati, Ohio | United States | For private owner. |
| Unknown date | Arethusa | Full-rigged ship | John M. Reed | Sunderland | United Kingdom | For J. Allan. |
| Unknown date | Aspasio | Snow | Pile & Smart | Sunderland | United Kingdom | For Burdess & Co. |
| Unknown date | Athene | Barque | R. H. Potts & Bros. | Sunderland | United Kingdom | For R. H. Potts & Bros. |
| Unknown date | Atlantic | Clipper | | | United Kingdom | For private owner. |
| Unknown date | Avle | Barque | | | Sweden | For private owner. |
| Unknown date | Bahia | Barque | James Hardie | Sunderland | United Kingdom | For F. P. Wilson. |
| Unknown date | Bebec | Snow | Joplin & Willoughby | Sunderland | United Kingdom | For private owner. |
| Unknown date | Belle of the Sea | Clipper | Ewall & Dutton | Marblehead, Massachusetts | United States | For T. B. Waters & Co. |
| Unknown date | Berengaria | Barque | George Barker | Sunderland | United Kingdom | For L. Harker. |
| Unknown date | Bermuda | Snow | Peverall & Davidson | Sunderland | United Kingdom | For private owner. |
| Unknown date | Black | Schooner | Merry & Grey | Milan, Ohio | United States | For United States Revenue Cutter Service. |
| Unknown date | Black Hawk | Medium clipper | William H. Webb | New York | United States | For Bucklin & Crane. |
| Unknown date | Brazil | Barque | | Richibucto | (United Kingdom of Great Britain and Ireland) Colony of New Brunswick | For private owner. |
| Unknown date | British Merchant | Full-rigged ship | Messrs. A. Duthie & Co. | Aberdeen | United Kingdom | For Messrs A. Duthie & Co. |
| Unknown date | British Monarch | Barque | R. Thompson Jr. | Sunderland | United Kingdom | For E. Graham Jr. |
| Unknown date | Cambridge | Barque | George Booth | Sunderland | United Kingdom | For private owner. |
| Unknown date | Ceres | Snow | Taylor & Scouler | Sunderland | United Kingdom | For Mr. Robinson. |
| Unknown date | Chanticleer | Barque | Briggs & Son | Sunderland | United Kingdom | For J. Shepherd. |
| Unknown date | Charente | Snow | John Barkes | Sunderland | United Kingdom | For private owner. |
| Unknown date | Chilian Packet | Barque | L & T. C. Gales | Sunderland | United Kingdom | For private owner. |
| Unknown date | Comet | Steamboat | Peak and Masters | Cleveland, Ohio | United States | For New York Central Railroad. |
| Unknown date | Coquimbo | Barque | W. R. Abbay & Co. | Sunderland | United Kingdom | For Moon & Co. |
| Unknown date | Cornubia | Steamship | G. W. & W. J. Hall | Sunderland | United Kingdom | For Martin & Co. |
| Unknown date | Cowslip | Barque | J. Davison | Sunderland | United Kingdom | For private owner. |
| Unknown date | Croquette | Brig | | Baltimore, Maryland | United States | For J. Crosby. |
| Unknown date | Curlew | Merchantman | R. H. Potts & Bros. | Sunderland | United Kingdom | For Potts Bros. |
| Unknown date | Danube | Barque | Green, Robinson & Co | Sunderland | United Kingdom | For private owner. |
| Unknown date | Dauntless | Barque | George Bartram | Sunderland | United Kingdom | For private owner. |
| Unknown date | Dawn | Steamship | Samuel Sneden | New York | United States | For private owner. |
| Unknown date | Dee | Merchantman | Arrow Leithead | Sunderland | United Kingdom | For G. Leslie. |
| Unknown date | Delaware | Barque | Pile & Smart | Sunderland | United Kingdom | For A. Hewson. |
| Unknown date | Delhi | Merchantman | Ratcliffe & Spence | Sunderland | United Kingdom | For private owner. |
| Unknown date | Dependent | Merchantman | Jopling & Hobson | Sunderland | United Kingdom | For private owner. |
| Unknown date | Derwent | Snow | W. R. Abbay & Co. | Sunderland | United Kingdom | For Gayner & Co. |
| Unknown date | Dewdrop | Snow | Rawson & Watson | Sunderland | United Kingdom | For Rawson & Co. |
| Unknown date | Diana | Paddle steamer | Messrs. Caird & Co. | Greenock | United Kingdom | For H. B. Prior. |
| Unknown date | Dick Fulton | Sternwheeler | | Allegheny County, Pennsylvania | United States | For private owner. |
| Unknown date | Doctor Kane | Barque | | Quebec | (United Kingdom of Great Britain and Ireland) Province of Canada | For private owner. |
| Unknown date | Dorothy | Snow | J. Lister | Sunderland | United Kingdom | For J. Crisp. |
| Unknown date | Druses | Barque | James Briggs | Sunderland | United Kingdom | For Walford & Co. |
| Unknown date | Dunorian | Merchantman | William Pile Jr. | Sunderland | United Kingdom | For Walker & Co. |
| Unknown date | Durham Packet | Merchantman | John Gill | Sunderland | United Kingdom | For private owner. |
| Unknown date | Earl of Mar and Kellie | Merchantman | | Alloa | United Kingdom | For private owner. |
| Unknown date | Edith | Lugger | | Sunderland | United Kingdom | For private owner. |
| Unknown date | Eglantine | Barque | Rawson & Watson | Sunderland | United Kingdom | For Mr. Donkin. |
| Unknown date | Elizabeth | Merchantman | T. H. Woods | Sunderland | United Kingdom | For private owner. |
| Unknown date | Elizabeth and Ann | Barque | George Short | Sunderland | United Kingdom | For J. Carr. |
| Unknown date | Ellen | Schooner | William Bonker | Salcombe | United Kingdom | For P. O. Hingstone, Samuel Beer and others. |
| Unknown date | Emblem | Merchantman | Hodgson & Gardiner | Sunderland | United Kingdom | For private owner. |
| Unknown date | Emeralde | Merchantman | J. Barkes | Sunderland | United Kingdom | For private owner. |
| Unknown date | Empress | Merchantman | William Petrie | Sunderland | United Kingdom | For private owner. |
| Unknown date | Englishman | Barque | J. Barkes | Sunderland | United Kingdom | For Thomas Gibson. |
| Unknown date | Eunomia | Merchantman | W. Johnson | Sunderland | United Kingdom | For private owner. |
| Unknown date | Express | Barque | Taylor & Scouler | Sunderland | United Kingdom | For Jane Gray. |
| Unknown date | Flatworth | Merchantman | William Harkess | Sunderland | United Kingdom | For private owner. |
| Unknown date | Frances Bamfield | Merchantman | Peter Gibson | Sunderland | United Kingdom | For private owner. |
| Unknown date | Gananoque | Clipper | George T Davie & Sons | Lauzon | (United Kingdom of Great Britain and Ireland) Province of Canada | For private owner. |
| Unknown date | General Rusk | Paddle steamer | | Wilmington, Delaware | United States | For Southern Steamship Co. |
| Unknown date | General Abbatrucci | Paddle steamer | Messrs. Scott & Co. | Greenock | United Kingdom | For MM Vallery, Fils et Cie. |
| Unknown date | Georgiana Grenfell | Barque | R. Thompson & Co. | Sunderland | United Kingdom | For Mr. Nicholson. |
| Unknown date | Glasgow | Clyde puffer | David Swan | Glasgow | United Kingdom | For private owner. |
| Unknown date | Goward | Brig | W. R. Abbay & Co | Sunderland | United Kingdom | For J. Goward. |
| Unknown date | Great Western | Paddle steamer | | Cincinnati, Ohio | United States | For private owner. |
| Unknown date | Griffin | Barque | W. H. Pearson | Sunderland | United Kingdom | For John Dale. |
| Unknown date | Gromsboi | Frigate | | Helsinki | (Russian Empire) Grand Duchy of Finland | For Imperial Russian Navy. |
| Unknown date | Guayacan | Barque | William Pile Jr. | Sunderland | United Kingdom | For Madge & Co. |
| Unknown date | Hannah Andrew | Merchantman | James Robinson | Sunderland | United Kingdom | For R. Adamson. |
| Unknown date | Hercules | Barque | Edward Bailey | Sunderland | United Kingdom | For William Nicholson. |
| Unknown date | Hercules | Steamship | James Laing | Sunderland | United Kingdom | For Edward T. Gourley, William Stobart & Chrisopher M. Webster. |
| Unknown date | Heroine | Barque | R. Reay | Sunderland | United Kingdom | For George Watson. |
| Unknown date | Herrington | Merchantman | John Robinson | Sunderland | United Kingdom | For private owner. |
| Unknown date | Hersilia | Full-rigged ship | R. Thompson & Sons | Sunderland | United Kingdom | For H. Ellis. |
| Unknown date | Hotspur | Medium clipper | Roosevelt & Joyce | New York | United States | For Frank Hathaway and parties. |
| Unknown date | Il Trovatore | Merchantman | Hodgson & Gardiner | Sunderland | United Kingdom | For private owner. |
| Unknown date | Indus | Full-rigged ship | D. A. Douglas & Co.. | Sunderland | United Kingdom | For Fenwick & Co. |
| Unknown date | Isabel | Merchantman | Hodgson & Gardner | Sunderland | United Kingdom | For private owner. |
| Unknown date | Isabella Robinson | Merchantman | Hume & Easson | Sunderland | United Kingdom | For private owner. |
| Unknown date | Island Queen | Merchantman | N. Stothard | Sunderland | United Kingdom | For private owner. |
| Unknown date | Itia-Murometz | Frigate | | Arkhangelsk | Russia | For Imperial Russian Navy. |
| Unknown date | Jane Pardew | Merchantman | George Booth | Sunderland | United Kingdom | For Smith & Co. |
| Unknown date | Jane Selkirk | Merchantman | Pickersgill & Miller | Sunderland | United Kingdom | For private owner. |
| Unknown date | Japan | Bali-class sloop | Fop Smit | Kinderdijk | Netherlands | For Imperial Japanese Navy. |
| Unknown date | Jessie | Merchantman | N. Stothard | Sunderland | United Kingdom | For private owner. |
| Unknown date | Jessie Annandale | Brigantine | Brown & Johnson | Sunderland | United Kingdom | For B. Balkwill. |
| Unknown date | Jessie Drysdale | Merchantman | James Hardie | Sunderland | United Kingdom | For private owner. |
| Unknown date | John Downie | Merchantman | George Bartram & Sons | Sunderland | United Kingdom | For Downie & Co. |
| Unknown date | John Paxton | Merchantman | W. R. Abbay & Co | Sunderland | United Kingdom | For Mr. Matherson. |
| Unknown date | John Stephenson | Merchantman | Peter Gibson | Sunderland | United Kingdom | For private owner. |
| Unknown date | Latona | Merchantman | John M. Reed | Sunderland | United Kingdom | For private owner. |
| Unknown date | Laughing Water | Clipper | | | United Kingdom | For private owner. |
| Unknownndate | Levant | Paddle steamer | | River Clyde | United Kingdom | For private owner. |
| Unknown date | Lizzie Scott | Merchantman | L. & T. C. Gales | Sunderland | United Kingdom | For private owner. |
| Unknown date | Lizzie Tindall | Merchantman | J. Haswell | Sunderland | United Kingdom | For private owner. |
| Unknown date | Llanfair | Sloop | Brundrit & Whiteway | Runcorn | United Kingdom | For Brundrit & Whiteway. |
| Unknown date | Lyra | Swallow-class sloop | | Deptford Dockyard | United Kingdom | For Royal Navy. |
| Unknown date | Magic | Yacht | T. Byerly & Son | Philadelphia, Pennsylvania | United States | For Richard Fanning Loper. |
| Unknown date | Margaret Smith | Clipper | | Greenock | United Kingdom | For private owner. |
| Unknown date | Marshmallow | Merchantman | John Robinson | Sunderland | United Kingdom | For private owner. |
| Unknown date | Mary | Barque | W. H. Pearson | Sunderland | United Kingdom | For J. Tully. |
| Unknown date | Matilda Atheling | Full-rigged ship | James Briggs & Co. | Sunderland | United Kingdom | For L. Harker. |
| Unknown date | Maynards | Merchantman | Jobling & Hobson | Sunderland | United Kingdom | For private owner. |
| Unknown date | Metaris | Merchantman | Peter Austin | Sunderland | United Kingdom | For Mr. Buckley. |
| Unknown date | Midlothian | Merchantman | J. Haswell | Sunderland | United Kingdom | For private owner. |
| Unknown date | Minnehaha | Barque | | | United Kingdom | For Richard Hughes & Co. |
| Unknown date | Minniehaha | Full-riggedship | | Saint John | (United Kingdom of Great Britain and Ireland) Colony of New Brunswick | For Liverpool Line. |
| Unknown date | Moldavian | Barque | Austin & Mils | Sunderland | United Kingdom | For Gilbert Ward. |
| Unknown date | Monica | Merchantman | George Worthy | Sunderland | United Kingdom | For private owner. |
| Unknown date | National Guard | Steamship | George D. Morgan | Portland, Connecticut | United States | For private owner. |
| Unknown date | Neda | Barque | Arrow Leithead | Sunderland | United Kingdom | For John Thompson. |
| Unknown date | Nemesis | Merchantman | R. Watson | Sunderland | United Kingdom | For private owner. |
| Unknown date | Newcastle | Clipper | W. Pile Jr. | Sunderland | United Kingdom | For Green Blackwall Line. |
| Unknown date | Oliver M. Pettit | Steamship | | Williamsburg, New York | United States | For private owner. |
| Unknown date | Oracle | Steamship | | Deptford | United Kingdom | For private owner. |
| Unknown date | Palestine | Merchantman | George Booth | Sunderland | United Kingdom | For private owner. |
| Unknown date | Palestine | Merchantman | Pickersgill & Miller | Sunderland | United Kingdom | For private owner. |
| Unknown date | Pallion | Merchantman | R. Wilkinson | Sunderland | United Kingdom | For private owner. |
| Unknown date | Pearl | Merchantman | William Richardson | Sunderland | United Kingdom | For private owner. |
| Unknown date | Pelican | Barque | John M. Reed Jr. | Pallion | United Kingdom | For private owner. |
| Unknown date | Peosta | Paddle steamer | | Cincinnati, Ohio | United States | For private owner. |
| Unknown date | Peter Kay | Clipper | | | United Kingdom | For private owner. |
| Unknown date | Phantom | Merchantman | William Briggs | Sunderland | United Kingdom | For private owner. |
| Unknown date | Phineas Sprague | Steamship | Birely & Lynn | Philadelphia, Pennsylvania | United States | For private owner. |
| Unknown date | Planet | Merchantman | Thomas Seymour | Sunderland | United Kingdom | For private owner. |
| Unknown date | Pomona | Merchantman | George Gardner | Sunderland | United Kingdom | For private owner. |
| Unknown date | Prince Frederick William | Merchantman | G. Gardner & Co. | Sunderland | United Kingdom | For private owner. |
| Unknown date | Queen of Commerce | Merchantman | Nicholas Stothard | Sunderland | United Kingdom | For private owner. |
| Unknown date | Red Riding Hood | Full-rigged ship | Thomas Bilbe & Co. | Rotherhithe | United Kingdom | For Thomas Bilbe & Co. |
| Unknown date | Richard and Alice | Merchantman | Green, Robinson & Co | Sunderland | United Kingdom | For private owner. |
| Unknown date | Roebuck | Merchantman | William Naizby | Sunderland | United Kingdom | For private owner. |
| Unknown date | Rose | Merchantman | Woods, Spence & Co. | Sunderland | United Kingdom | For private owner. |
| Unknown date | Saint George | Barque | William Naisby | Sunderland | United Kingdom | For Smith & Co. |
| Unknown date | Sarah | Brig | R. Sanderson | Hylton | United Kingdom | For Good & Co. |
| Unknown date | Sarah Love | Barque | Sykes & Co | Cox Green | United Kingdom | For Wright & Co. |
| Unknown date | Saxon Queen | Merchantman | Todd & Brown | Sunderland | United Kingdom | For private owner. |
| Unknown date | Seamew | Merchantman | John Robinson | Sunderland | United Kingdom | For private owner. |
| Unknown date | Shubrick | Lighthouse tender | Philadelphia Navy Yard | Philadelphia, Pennsylvania | United States | For United States Lighthouse Board. |
| Unknown date | Sisters | Snow | James Hardie | Sunderland | United Kingdom | For J. Robinson. |
| Unknown date | Solway | Full-rigged ship | R. Thompson Jr. | Sunderland | United Kingdom | For E. Graham. |
| Unknown date | Southfield | Ferry | John English | Brooklyn, New York | United States | For New York Ferry Company. |
| Unknown date | Southport | Barque | Todd & Brown | Sunderland | United Kingdom | For Henry Harrison & William Hope. |
| Unknown date | Spring Flower | Merchantman | Austin & Mills | Sunderland | United Kingdom | For Potts & Co. |
| Unknown date | Squall | Sloop | Brundrit & Whiteway | Runcorn | United Kingdom | For Brundrit & Whiteway. |
| Unknown date | Star Beam | Barque | E. Bailey | Sunderland | United Kingdom | For Elmsie & Co. |
| Unknown date | Star of the West | Merchantman | James Briggs & Co. | Sunderland | United Kingdom | For private owner. |
| Unknown date | Strive | Schooner | Hearn & Arther | Sunderland | United Kingdom | For Hearn & Co. |
| Unknown date | Sunflower | Merchantman | J. Lister | Sunderland | United Kingdom | For private owner. |
| Unknown date | Sunium | Snow | William Petrie | Sunderland | United Kingdom | For A. Tindall. |
| Unknown date | Swan | Sternwheeler | Silas E. Smith & George Anson Pease | Tualatin River | United States | For private owner. |
| Unknown date | Swansea | Merchantman | Thomas Lightfoot | Sunderland | United Kingdom | For private owner. |
| Unknown date | Syra | Corvette | | Deptford Dockytard | United Kingdom | For Royal Navy. |
| Unknown date | Talbot | Merchantman | G. W. & W. J. Hall | Sunderland | United Kingdom | For private owner. |
| Unknown date | Thankful | Merchantman | R. Thompson & Sons | Sunderland | United Kingdom | For Carr & Co. |
| Unknown date | The Coquette | Snow | Jobling & Willoughby | Sunderland | United Kingdom | For Smith & Co. |
| Unknown date | Three Brothers | Lighter | Sykes & Co | Sunderland | United Kingdom | For Sykes & Co. |
| Unknown date | Tiber | Merchantman | J. Briggs & Co. | Sunderland | United Kingdom | For private owner. |
| Unknown date | Tiger | Steamship | Brownlow, Pearson & Co. | Hull | United Kingdom | For Brownlow, Pearson & Co. |
| Unknown date | Trebizonde | Steamship | | | United Kingdom | For Österreichischer Lloyd. |
| Unknown date | Troas | Full-rigged ship | William R. Abbay | Sunderland | United Kingdom | For T. Parker. |
| Unknown date | Undaunted | Full-rigged ship | Thomas Henderson | Sunderland | United Kingdom | For private owner. |
| Unknown date | United Service | Steamship | builder | Sunderland | United Kingdom | For London & Canada Steamship Line. |
| Unknown date | Useful | Snow | | Sunderland | United Kingdom | For Mr. Caithness. |
| Unknown date | Vanderbilt | Passenger ship | Jeremiah Simonson | Greenpoint, New York | United States | For North Atlantic Mail Steamship Line. |
| Unknown date | Vere | Barque | William Watson | Sunderland | United Kingdom | For Mr. Thompson. |
| Unknown date | Vicksburg | Paddle steamer | | New Albany, Indiana | United States | For private owner. |
| Unknown date | Vigilant | Barque | Thomas Tiffin | Sunderland | United Kingdom | For Tiffin & Co. |
| Unknown date | Wanderer | Schooner | Joseph Rowland | Setauket, New York | United States | For John Johnson. |
| Unknown date | Waterlily | Snow | Arrow Leithead | Sunderland | United Kingdom | For Russell & Co. |
| Unknown date | William | Barque | Robert Candlish | Sunderland | United Kingdom | For R. Allen. |
| Unknown date | William G. Putnam | Paddle tug | | Brooklyn, New York | United States | For private owner. |
| Unknown date | Wings of the Morning | Merchantman | Ratcliff & Spence | Sunderland | United Kingdom | For private owner. |
| Unknown date | Zula | Steamship | Messrs. Charles Scott & Son | Greenock | United Kingdom | For private owner. |
| Unknown date | Unnamed | Steamship | | Pallion | United Kingdom | For Messrs. R. J. Brown & Co. |
