= List of shipwrecks in February 1859 =

The list of shipwrecks in February 1859 includes ships sunk, foundered, grounded, or otherwise lost during February 1859.

== 1 February ==
List of shipwrecks: 1 February 1859
Ship	State	Description
Charlotte Jane	United Kingdom	The ship ran aground on the Crookrahatta Lump, in the Hooghly River. She was on a voyage from London to Calcutta, India. She was refloated and completed her voyage in a leaky condition.
Countess of Leicester	United Kingdom	The brig ran aground on the Longsand, in the North Sea off the coast of Essex. She was on a voyage from Newcastle upon Tyne, Northumberland to Saint-Malo, Ille-et-Vilaine. She was refloated.
Experiment	United Kingdom	The ship was driven ashore on Horse Isle, in the Firth of Clyde with the loss of two of her crew.
Jeune Augustine	France	The ship struck a sunken wreck in the English Channel 12 nautical miles (22 km) north west of Calais. She was on a voyage from Blyth, Northumberland, United Kingdom to Port-en-Bessin, Calvados. She consequently put in to Lowestoft, Suffolk, United Kingdom in a leaky condition the next day.
Victory	United Kingdom	The tug sank at Birkenhead, Cheshire.

== 2 February ==
List of shipwrecks: 2 February 1859
Ship	State	Description
Crocus	United Kingdom	The ship ran aground on the Barber Sand, in the North Sea off the coast of Norfolk. She was on a voyage from Caen, Calvados, France to Newcastle upon Tyne, Northumberland. She was refloated with assistance from the Caister Lifeboat.
Dare	United Kingdom	The brig ran aground on the Roar Sand, in the English Channel off the coast of Kent. She was on a voyage from South Shields, County Durham to Cherbourg, Manche, France. She was refloated and taken in to Dover, Kent in a leaky condition.
D'Elmira, and Vizcaya	Netherlands; Spain	D'Elmira collided with the barque Vizcaya in the English Channel off Beachy Head, Sussex, United Kingdom. She was severely damaged was towed in to Portsmouth, Hampshire, United Kingdom by the tug Don (United Kingdom. Vizcaya's crew got aboard D'Elmira She was on a voyage from London, United Kingdom to Bordeaux, Gironde, France. Vizcaya was subsequently boarded by the Brighton and Newhaven Lifeboats. She was towed in to Newhaven, Sussex by the steamship Lyons (United Kingdom).
Eagle	United Kingdom	The schooner collided with the brig Alma (United Kingdom) and sank off Margate, Kent. Her crew were rescued.
Moderator	United Kingdom	The ship sank in the Bristol Channel off Portishead, Somerset. She was on a voyage from Bristol, Gloucestershire to Newport, Monmouthshire. She was refloated and taken in tow in a capsized condition.
Richmond	United Kingdom	The schooner collided with another vessel and sank off Kingsdown, Kent. All but her captain were rescued by the vessel she collided with. Her captain was rescued by the Deal lugger Seaman's Hope (United Kingdom). Richmond was on a voyage from Middlesbrough, Yorkshire to Dieppe, Seine-Inférieure, France.
Rocket	United Kingdom	The ship was driven ashore at Mockbeggar, Cheshire. She was on a voyage from Newry, County Antrim to Liverpool, Lancashire.
Thetis	France	The brig ran aground on the Newcombe Sand, in the North Sea off the coast of Suffolk, United Kingdom. She was on a voyage from Newcastle upon Tyne to Brest, Finistère. She was refloated with the assistance of the tug Powerful and assisted in to Lowestoft, Suffolk.

== 3 February ==
List of shipwrecks: 3 February 1859
Ship	State	Description
Archimede	Kingdom of Sardinia	The ship was driven ashore east of Calais, France. She was on a voyage from Hartlepool, County Durham, United Kingdom to Constantinople, Ottoman Empire. She had become a wreck by 19 February.
Cymbeline	United Kingdom	The ship departed from Liverpool, Lancashire for Saint John's, Newfoundland, British North America. No further trace, presumed foundered with the loss of all hands.
Erin	United Kingdom	The ship ran aground on the Falsterbo Reef, in the Baltic Sea. She was on a voyage from Danzig to London. She was refloated on 9 February and taken in to Helsingør, Denmark in a leaky condition.
Vernon	United States	The ship was driven ashore at Nahant, Massachusetts. Her crew were rescued. She was on a voyage from Messina, Sicily to Boston, Massachusetts.

== 4 February ==
List of shipwrecks: 4 February 1859
Ship	State	Description
Bijou	United Kingdom	The schooner ran aground on the Margate Sand, off the coast of Kent. She was refloated the next day and taken in to the River Thames.
Ceres	United Kingdom	The ship ran aground on the Sizewell Bank, in the North Sea off the coast of Suffolk. She was refloated and taken in to Lowestoft, Suffolk.
Grace	United Kingdom	The brig ran aground on the Sizewell Bank. She was refloated and taken in to Lowestoft.
Himalaya	United Kingdom	The steamship ran aground in the Solent.
Jubilee	United Kingdom	The full-rigged ship was driven ashore and wrecked at Boulogne, Pas-de-Calais, France. Her 25 crew were rescued. She was refloated on 1 June.
Maxim	United Kingdom	The brig ran aground on the Shipwash Sand, in the North Sea off the coast of Suffolk. She was refloated and beached at Lowestoft. Maxim was refloated the next day and taken in to Lowestoft.
North Star	United Kingdom	The brig was wrecked at New River, New Zealand when she became stranded on a bar during a gale.
Thalestris	United Kingdom	The ship ran aground on the Burbo Bank, in Liverpool Bay. She was on a voyage from Liverpool, Lancashire to Barbados. She was refloated and put back to Liverpool.

== 5 February ==
List of shipwrecks: 5 February 1859
Ship	State	Description
Five Brothers	(United Kingdom of Great Britain and Ireland) Straits Settlements	The steamship was wrecked on Capchee Point, China. She was attacked by the Chinese with some loss of life. Survivors were rescued by the schooner Zephyr (United Kingdom). Five Brothers was on a voyage from Hong Kong to Swatow and Amoy, China.
Ignes de Castro	Portugal	The steamship was driven ashore near Peniche. She was on a voyage from Glasgow, Renfrewshire, United Kingdom to Lisbon.

== 6 February ==
List of shipwrecks: 6 February 1859
Ship	State	Description
Governor Anderson	United Kingdom	The ship was driven ashore at Fos-sur-Mer, Bouches-du-Rhône, France. She was on a voyage from Marseille, Bouches-du-Rhône to an English port. She was later refloated and taken int o Bône, Algeria, where she arrived on 4 March.
Jane	United Kingdom	The smack was struck the Horse Rock, off Ramsey Island, Pembrokeshire and sank. Her crew were rescued. She was on a voyage from Neath, Glamorgan to Port Madoc, Caernarfonshire.
Miaza	United Kingdom	The brig ran aground on the Stoney Binks, in the North Sea off the mouth of the Humber. She was on a voyage from Sunderland, County Durham to Honfleur, Calvados, France. She was refloated with the assistance of the smack Hart (United Kingdom) and taken in to Grimsby, Lincolnshire in a severely damaged condition.
Mentor	Stettin	The crewless brig was driven ashore and wrecked at Hjørring, Denmark. She was on a voyage from Hartlepool, County Durham, United Kingdom to Stettin.
St. Anne	United Kingdom	The smack was wrecked near Galway. Her crew were rescued.
Valkyrien	Sweden	The brig ran aground at Malta. She was on a voyage from London, United Kingdom to Constantinople, Ottoman Empire. She was refloated and put in to Malta in a leaky condition.

== 7 February ==
List of shipwrecks: 7 February 1859
Ship	State	Description
Pioneer	United Kingdom	The ship collided with Copia (United Kingdom) and foundered in the Irish Sea. Her crew were rescued. She was on a voyage from Bowling, Dunbartonshire to Morecambe Bay.

== 8 February ==
List of shipwrecks: 8 February 1859
Ship	State	Description
Ann	United Kingdom	The ship ran aground in the River Alde at Orford, Suffolk.
Elfin	United Kingdom	The schooner was in collision with the steamship Prince Patrick (United Kingdom) and sank in the Irish Sea 13 nautical miles (24 km) off Fleetwood, Lancashire with the loss of five of the nine people on board. She was on a voyage from Ardrossan, Ayrshire to Liverpool, Lancashire.
Elizabeth and Jane	United Kingdom	The schooner collided with the full-rigged ship R. L. Lane (United States) and was beached at Tranmere, Cheshire.
Francis P. Beck	United States	The brig was wrecked on the Riding Rocks, off Grand Bahama, Bahamas. She was on a voyage from New Orleans, Louisiana to Providence, Rhode Island.
Gentleman	Stralsund	The brig was driven ashore on Skagen, Denmark. She was on a voyage from Stralsund to Leith, Lothian, United Kingdom.
Ignez de Castro	(United Kingdom of Great Britain and Ireland) New Zealand	The steamship was wrecked at Peniche, Portugal. Crew and passengers saved.
HMS Wizard	Royal Navy	The Cherokee-class brig-sloop was wrecked on the Seal Rock, in Bantry Bay. Her crew were rescued by HMS Skipjack (Royal Navy).

== 9 February ==
List of shipwrecks: 9 February 1859
Ship	State	Description
Erin	United Kingdom	The ship struck the breakwater at Holyhead, Anglesey and was severely damaged. She was on a voyage from Liverpool, Lancashire to Dublin. She was towed in to Holyhead in a sinking condition.
Herald	United Kingdom	The schooner struck rocks off Rutland Island, County Donegal. She was on a voyage from Wick, Caithness to the River Clyde. She was refloated and taken in to "Port Adara" in a leaky condition.
Juno	United Kingdom	The ship struck the Feenish Rocks, off the coast of County Galway. She was then driven ashore in the Aran Islands and was wrecked. Her crew were rescued. She was on a voyage from Galway to Portsmouth, Hampshire.
Mercator	United Kingdom	The sloop foundered in the Bristol Channel off Portishead, Somerset. She was on a voyage from Bristol, Gloucestershire to Newport, Monmouthshire. She was later refloated and towed back to Bristol.
Pangan	United Kingdom	The schooner collided with Rochenham (United Kingdom) and sank off The Skerries, Anglesey with the loss of a crew member. She was on a voyage from Liverpool, Lancashire to Dublin.
St. Nicholas	United Kingdom	The ship was driven ashore near Aberdeen. Her crew were rescued. She was on a voyage from Newcastle upon Tyne, Northumberland to Aberdeen. She had become a wreck by 12 February.
Vixen	United Kingdom	The schooner ran aground on the Bahama Bank, in the Irish Sea north east of the Isle of Man and was wrecked with the loss of six of her thirteen crew. She was on a voyage from Gourock, Renfrewshire to Liverpool.

== 10 February ==
List of shipwrecks: 10 February 1859
Ship	State	Description
Eblana	United Kingdom	The barque was abandoned in the Atlantic Ocean. Her crew survived. She was on a voyage from Mauritius to London.
Emma	United Kingdom	The barque was driven ashore and wrecked at Cape Lookout, North Carolina, United States. She was on a voyage from New York to Jacksonville, Florida.
Joseph	Austrian Empire	The brig was driven ashore at Ballyhack, County Wexford, United Kingdom. She was refloated.
Mechanic	United Kingdom	The ship was wrecked at Holyhead, Anglesey. She was on a voyage from Liverpool, Lancashire to Dublin.
Sea Bird	(United Kingdom of Great Britain and Ireland) New Zealand	The steamship capsized and sank off Quail Island. Her crew were rescued.
Vigilant	United Kingdom	The ship was abandoned off Montrose, Forfarshire. All but her captain were taken off by the Montrose Lifeboat. She was subsequently towed in to Montrose.
William	United Kingdom	The ship was damaged by fire at Berbice, British Guiana.

== 11 February ==
List of shipwrecks: 11 February 1859
Ship	State	Description
Annette Gilbert	United Kingdom	The ship wrecked in the Sooloo Sea. Her crew were rescued. she was on a voyage from "Coti" to Singapore, Straits Settlements.
Corredo	Mexico	The ship was wrecked at Guaymas.
Merioneth	United Kingdom	The ship ran aground at Port Madoc, Caernarfonshire. She was on a voyage from Port Madoc to Liverpool, Lancashire.
Rising Sun	United Kingdom	The schooner ran aground and sank at Poole, Dorset. She was on a voyage from Swanage, Dorset to London.
Robert McWilliam	United Kingdom	The ship was driven ashore at Neath, Glamorgan. She was on a voyage from Swansea, Glamorgan to Cartagena, Spain. She was refloated and beached at the Mumbles, Glamorgan. She was refloated on 18 February.

== 12 February ==
List of shipwrecks: 12 February 1859
Ship	State	Description
Hendrika Morgreska	Netherlands	The brigantine ran aground in the Irish Sea off the Irish coast. She was on a voyage from Liverpool, Lancashire, United Kingdom to Rotterdam, South Holland. She consequently put in to Holyhead, Anglesey, United Kingdom in a sinking condition.
Reindeer	United States	The clipper was wrecked off Iba, Spanish East Indies. She was on a voyage from Manila, Spanish East Indies to San Francisco, California.
Schwan	Bremen	The steamship ran aground in the Weser near Imsum. She was on a voyage from Bremen to Hull, Yorkshire, United Kingdom. She was refloated and resumed her voyage.

== 13 February ==
List of shipwrecks: 13 February 1859
Ship	State	Description
Anna Isabella	United Kingdom	The brig was abandoned in the Atlantic Ocean shortly before she foundered. Her crew were rescued by R. D. Shepherd (United States). Anna Isabella was on a voyage from Saint John's, Newfoundland, British North America to Waterford.
European	United Kingdom	The steamship ran aground on the West Hoyle Bank, in Liverpool Bay. She was on a voyage from Limerick to Liverpool, Lancashire. European was refloated with the assistance of the tug Prowler and taken in to Liverpool the next day.

== 14 February ==
List of shipwrecks: 14 February 1859
Ship	State	Description
Diana	Kingdom of Hanover	The ship collided with a barque and sank in the North Sea. 13 nautical miles (24 km) off Tynemouth, Northumberland, United Kingdom. Her crew were rescued by Auguste (Russia). Diana was on a voyage from Newcastle upon Tyne, Northumberland to Brake.
Rowena	United Kingdom	The ship ran aground at Liverpool, Lancashire. She was on a voyage from Liverpool to Athens, Greece.
Rubenow	United Kingdom	The ship ran aground in the River Mersey. She was on a voyage from Liverpool to Trieste. She was refloated and put back to Liverpool in a leaky condition.

== 15 February ==
List of shipwrecks: 15 February 1859
Ship	State	Description
Lenna	Denmark	The ship was wrecked near the Morups Tånge Lighthouse, Sweden. She was on a voyage from Newcastle upon Tyne, Northumberland, United Kingdom to Copenhagen.
William Hutt	United Kingdom	The steamship, a collier, was driven ashore. She was refloated the next day but then ran aground on the Longsand, in the North Sea off the coast of Essex. William Hutt was on a voyage from Sunderland, County Durham to London. She was refloated with the assistance of six smacks and resumed her voyage.
Wonga Wonga	(United Kingdom of Great Britain and Ireland) New Zealand	The steamship ran aground at the mouth of the Manawatu River. She was refloated after 4 days.

== 16 February ==
List of shipwrecks: 16 February 1859
Ship	State	Description
Amelia	United Kingdom	The brig ran aground on the Cork Sand, in the North Sea off the coast of Suffolk. She was on a voyage from West Hartlepool, County Durham to London. She was refloated and taken in to Woodbridge, Suffolk in a waterlogged condition.
Annogara	United Kingdom	The ship was driven ashore at Wells-next-the-Sea, Norfolk.
Diana	United Kingdom	The brig ran aground on the Holme Sand, in the North Sea off the coast of Suffolk. She was refloated and taken in to Lowestoft, Suffolk in a leaky condition.
Luctor et Emergo	Netherlands	The barque ran aground on the Owers Sandbank, in the English Channel off the coast of Sussex, United Kingdom and was abandoned. She was on a voyage from Batavia, Netherlands East Indies to Middelburg, Zeeland. She had become a wreck by 19 February.
Maid of Julpha	(United Kingdom of Great Britain and Ireland) Victoria	The ship was driven ashore at Warrnambool and caught fire.
Reliance	(United Kingdom of Great Britain and Ireland) Jamaica	The sloop was lost between Old House Point and Rock Bay.

== 17 February ==
List of shipwrecks: 17 February 1859
Ship	State	Description
Bay	United Kingdom	The Mersey Flat was driven ashore and wrecked at Havering Point, between Ravenglass, Cumberland and the mouth of the River Duddon with the loss of all hands. She was on a voyage from Whitehaven, Cumberland to Liverpool, Lancashire.
Courrier de Filfila	Flag unknown	The ship was wrecked near Phillippeville, Algeria with the loss of seven lives.
Despina M	Austrian Empire	The brig was wrecked near Cape St. Vincent, Portugal. She was on a voyage from Berdyansk, Russia to Queenstown, County Cork, United Kingdom.
Elizabeth and Sarah	United Kingdom	The schooner was driven ashore at Southwold, Suffolk. She was on a voyage from South Shields, County Durham to Southwold. She was refloated and taken in to Southwold in a waterlogged condition.
Emily	United Kingdom	The barque ran aground and was wrecked on Cay Bokel. She was on a voyage form London to Belize City, British Honduras.
Viscount Arbuthnot	United Kingdom	The ship struck the Newton Rocks, on the coast of Northumberland. She was assisted in the Lindisfarne, Northumberland in a leaky condition.

== 18 February ==
List of shipwrecks: 18 February 1859
Ship	State	Description
Emily	United Kingdom	The barque was wrecked on a reef 25 nautical miles (46 km) off Belize City, British Honduras. She was on a voyage from London to Belize City.
Father Mathew	United Kingdom	The ship was driven ashore on Callantsoog, Groningen, Netherlands. She was on a voyage from Seaham, County Durham to Amsterdam, North Holland, Netherlands. She was refloated and taken in to Texel, North Holland, where she arrived on 21 January.

== 19 February ==
List of shipwrecks: 19 February 1859
Ship	State	Description
Breeze	United Kingdom	The ship sank in the Scheldt between Borsele and Terneuzen, Zeeland, Netherlands. She was on a voyage from Antwerp, Belgium to Cork.
Commercie Compagnie, and Jackson	Netherlands; United Kingdom	Commercie Compagnie was driven into Jackson. Both were driven ashore at Vlissingen, Zeeland, where Commercie Compagnie was wrecked. Jackson was refloated and taken in to Vlissingen in a severely leaky condition.
Dorothy	United Kingdom	The schooner was damaged by an explosion in her cargo of coal at Sunderland, County Durham.
Egide	France	The schooner was driven ashore at Jury's Gap, Sussex. She was on a voyage from Sunderland to Nantes, Loire-Inférieure. She was refloated.

== 20 February ==
List of shipwrecks: 20 February 1859
Ship	State	Description
Black Warrior	United States	The 1,556-tons burden sidewheel paddle steamer ran aground at Rockaway, New York City. All on board were rescued. She was on a voyage from Havana, Cuba to New York City. She was refloated with the assistance of Achilles, Edwin Blount and Screamer (all United States) but ran aground again. She was wrecked in a gale on 24 February and sank in 35 feet (11 m) of water at 40°25.641′N 073°51.135′W.
B. Norris	United States	The full-rigged ship caught fire in Hobsons Bay. She was scuttled by HMVS Victoria (Royal Navy).
Ernest and George	United Kingdom	The ship ran aground on the Goodwin Sands, Kent. She was on a voyage from Newcastle upon Tyne, Northumberland to Constantinople, Ottoman Empire. She was refloated.
Minerva	United Kingdom	The brig ran aground on the Inner Barber Sand, in the North Sea off the coast of Norfolk. She was on a voyage from Rochester, Kent to Seaham, County Durham. She was refloated and resumed her voyage.

== 21 February ==
List of shipwrecks: 21 February 1859
Ship	State	Description
Henriette	Norway	The schooner was driven ashore on Tino, Kingdom of Sardinia. She was on a voyage from Newcastle upon Tyne, Northumberland, United Kingdom to Constantinople, Ottoman Empire. She was refloated on 23 February.

== 22 February ==
List of shipwrecks: 22 February 1859
Ship	State	Description
Brighton	United Kingdom	The ship sank at King's Lynn, Norfolk. She was on a voyage from Seaham, County Durham to King's Lynn.
Lapwing	United Kingdom	The paddle steamer collided with the steamship Islesman and sank off the Mull of Kintyre, Argyllshire with the loss of two lives. Survivors were rescued by Islesman. Lapwing was on a voyage from the Clyde to Inverness.
Mary	United Kingdom	The ship collided with the steamship Normandy (United Kingdom) and sank in the North Sea off Torquay, Devon. Her crew were rescued by Normandy. Mary was on a voyage from South Shields, County Durham to Torquay.
Thye	United Kingdom	The ship was wrecked at Heraklion, Crete. Her crew survived. She was on a voyage from Alexandria, Egypt to a British port.
Vigilant	United Kingdom	The steamship ran aground in the River Moy and was damaged. She was on a voyage from Liverpool, Lancashire to Ballina, County Mayo. She was refloated and towed in to Ballina.

== 23 February ==
List of shipwrecks: 23 February 1859
Ship	State	Description
Commerce de Carentan	France	The schooner was wrecked on the Haisborough Sands, in the North Sea off the coast of Norfolk, United Kingdom. Her crew were rescued. Commerce de Carentan was on a voyage from Sunderland, County Durham to Saint-Valery-sur-Somme, Somme, France. She subsequently floated off and was discovered off Dunwich, Suffolk, United Kingdom. She was taken in to Aldeburgh, Suffolk in a derelict condition.
Mary Adelaide	United Kingdom	The ship caught fire and was scuttled at New York, United States. She was on a voyage from New York to Queenstown, County Cork.

== 24 February ==
List of shipwrecks: 24 February 1859
Ship	State	Description
Greek Slave	United Kingdom	The brig was run into by the Thames barge James and sank in the River Thames at Barking, Essex. She was on a voyage from West Hartlepool, County Durham to London.

== 25 February ==
List of shipwrecks: 25 February 1859
Ship	State	Description
Jean Baptiste	France	The brig struck a submerged object and sank 16 nautical miles (30 km) east north east of the Tuskar Rock. Her crew took to a boat and were subsequently rescued by Aladdin (United Kingdom). Jean Baptiste was on a voyage from Constantinople, Ottoman Empire to Waterford and Liverpool, Lancashire, United Kingdom.

== 26 February ==
List of shipwrecks: 26 February 1859
Ship	State	Description
Fowler	United Kingdom	The brig was driven ashore at Sea Palling, Norfolk. She was on a voyage from Middlesbrough, Yorkshire to Calais, France. She was refloated and found to be leaky.
HMS Jaseur	Royal Navy	. The Algerine-class gunboat was wrecked on the Bajo Nuevo Bank in the Caribbean Sea. Her crew survived.
Phantom	(United Kingdom of Great Britain and Ireland) Jersey	The barque was wrecked on the Hartwell Reef, off Boa Vista, Cape Verde Islands. Her crew survived. She was on a voyage from Sunderland, County Durham to Shanghai, China.
Start	United States	The cargo schooner was lost on Narragansett Beach, Rhode Island. Crew saved.

== 27 February ==
List of shipwrecks: 27 February 1859
Ship	State	Description
Carnatic	United Kingdom	The barque struck Filey Brigg and sank in the North Sea off the coast of Yorkshire. She was on a voyage from Maldon, Essex to Newcastle upon Tyne, Northumberland.
Defender	United States	The clipper was wrecked on the Elizabeth Reef, in the Pacific Ocean. She was on a voyage from Puget Sound to Sydney, New South Wales.
Lochlibo	United Kingdom	The ship was wrecked on Hartland Point, Devon, England, while carrying coal from Newport, Wales, to Rio de Janeiro, Brazil. She was declared a total loss.
Prince Frederick William of Prussia	United Kingdom	The paddle steamer was driven ashore at Calais, France with the loss of three lives. Survivors were rescued by the steamship Ondine (United Kingdom). Prince Frederick William of Prussia was on a voyage from Dover, Kent to Calais. She was refloated the next day with the assistance of the steamship L'Imperatrice (France).
Richard and Alice	United Kingdom	The ship was driven ashore and wrecked at Frederikshavn, Denmark. She was on a voyage from Blyth, Northumberland to Copenhagen, Denmark.
Tam O'Shanter	United Kingdom	The schooner ran aground on the Archer Bank, at the mouth of the Seine.

== 28 February ==
List of shipwrecks: 28 February 1859
Ship	State	Description
Atlantic	United Kingdom	The barque ran aground on the Sizewell Bank, in the North Sea off the coast of Suffolk. She was on a voyage from Hull, Yorkshire to British Honduras. She was later refloated and taken in to Ramsgate, Kent, where she arrived on 19 March in a leaky condition.
Dahinda	United Kingdom	The schooner was wrecked on the Proudfoot Rocks, near Wick, Caithness. Her crew were rescued. She was on a voyage from Newcastle upon Tyne, Northumberland to Wick, Caithness.
Don	United Kingdom	The ship foundered in the North Sea off Flamborough Head, Yorkshire. Her crew were rescued. She was on a voyage from Seaham, County Durham to London.
Lochlibo	United Kingdom	The ship was driven ashore and damaged at Ilfracombe, Devon.

== Unknown date ==
List of shipwrecks: Unknown date in February 1859
Ship	State	Description
Active	United Kingdom	The ship foundered in the North Sea before 6 February.
Aglae	France	The ship was struck by lightning and sank off the coast of Africa. Her crew survived. She was on a voyage from Accra, Gold Coast to London, United Kingdom.
Aglae et Marie	France	The schooner was wrecked on the coast of Portugal.
Alchymist	United Kingdom	The ship was wrecked on the Indian coast.
Amelia and Mary	United Kingdom	The ship was abandoned in the North Sea before 18 February. her crew survived. She was on a voyage from Sunderland, County Durham to Hamburg.
Anna	Spain	The brig ran aground on the Longsand, in the North Sea off the coast of Essex, United Kingdom. She was refloated with the assistance of the smacks Alfred and Celerity (both United Kingdom).
Betsey	United Kingdom	The schooner foundered off Great Yarmouth, Norfolk.
Bruce	United Kingdom	The schooner was driven into the pier and sank in Loch Melfort before 3 February. Her crew were rescued. She was on a voyage from Troon, Ayrshire to Loch Melfort.
European	United Kingdom	The steamship ran aground on the West Hoyle Bank, in Liverpool Bay. She was on a voyage from Limerick to Liverpool, Lancashire. She was refloated on 14 February and taken in to Liverpool in a leaky condition.
Freia	Denmark	The brig was wrecked at Babao, Macao, China before 7 February. Her crew were rescued. She was reported to be on a voyage from Sunderland to Havana, Cuba
Furlose	Austrian Empire	The ship was wrecked off Sulina, Ottoman Empire in late February. Her crew were rescued by Susan (United Kingdom).
Gentoo	United Kingdom	The ship was wrecked at Panama City, Granadine Confederation.
Glentilt	United Kingdom	The ship caught fire in the Atlantic Ocean before 21 February. She was on a voyage from Cardiff, Glamorgan to the River Plate. She put in to the Rio Grande, where she sank.
H. Volant	United Kingdom	The ship sank at Kirkcudbright before 4 February. She was refloated.
James	United Kingdom	The brig collided with Richard Cobden (United Kingdom) and sank off the Tuskar Rock. Her crew were rescued. She was on a voyage from Fleetwood, Lancashire to Port-au-Prince, Haiti.
Jubilee	United Kingdom	The brigantine was driven ashore and wrecked at Minsmere Sluice, Suffolk before 14 February.
Julie	United Kingdom	The ship was driven ashore near Laguna. She was on a voyage from Veracruz, Mexico to Liverpool.
Mary Anna	United Kingdom	The ship foundered in the North Sea before 25 February.
Palm	United Kingdom	The ship was driven ashore at Guadeloupe.
Portia	United Kingdom	The ship ran aground in the Hooghly River. She was on a voyage from Moulmein, Burma to Calcutta, India.
Saint Clément	France	The ship foundered. All on board were rescued by Der Wager (Prussia). Saint Clément was on a voyage from Llanelly, Glamorgan to Nantes, Loire-Inférieure.
South Carolina	United States	The ship was wrecked at Mobile, Alabama before 4 February.
HMS Spitfire	Royal Navy	The survey ship was driven ashore on Sherborough Island, Sierra Leone. She was refloated three days later.
Tribune	United Kingdom	The ship was driven ashore at Porto, Portugal.
Vernon	United Kingdom	The ship was driven ashore at King's Lynn, Norfolk. She was on a voyage from Smyrna, Ottoman Empire to Boston, Lincolnshire. She was refloated and completed her voyage, arriving at Boston on 12 February.
Vesta	United Kingdom	The ship foundered before 5 February. Her crew were rescued. She was on a voyage from Liverpool to Singapore, Straits Settlements.
Victory	United Kingdom	The tug sank at Birkenhead, Cheshire. She was refloated on 17 February.
HMS Vulture	Royal Navy	The Cyclops-class frigate was driven ashore on the Barbary Coast. She was refloated and assisted in to Malta by HMS Perseverance (Royal Navy), arriving on 21 February.
Walmaet	Netherlands	The schooner was driven ashore at Málaga, Spain.
Wildflower	United Kingdom	The ship was driven ashore and wrecked at Augusta, Sicily before 12 February. She was on a voyage from Newport, Monmouthshire to Trieste.
