= USS Judge Torrence =

Ammunition ship of the United States Navy

History

United States
- Acquired: 30 September 1862
- Commissioned: 25 December 1862
- Decommissioned: 1 August 1865
- Fate: Sold, 17 August 1865

General characteristics
- Displacement: 700 tons
- Length: 179 ft 1 in (54.58 m)
- Beam: 45 ft 6 in (13.87 m)
- Draft: 9 ft (2.7 m)
- Propulsion: steam engine; side wheel-propelled
- Speed: 6 knots (11 km/h; 6.9 mph)
- Armament: two 24-pounder smoothbore howitzers

USS Judge Torrence was a steamer acquired by the Union Navy during the American Civil War. She was used by the Union Navy as an ammunition ship in support of the Union Navy.

== Service history ==
Judge Torrence was a steamer purchased by the U.S. War Department 10 February 1862 for use as an ordnance ship in the Western Gunboat Flotilla organized by the Union Army on the Ohio and Mississippi Rivers soon after the outbreak of the American Civil War. She was transferred to the Union Navy 30 September 1862 and commissioned at Cairo, Illinois, 25 December, Comdr. LeRoy Fitch in command. Judge Torrence departed Cairo 14 March 1862 to supply the flotilla with ammunition during operations against Island No. 10. She continued to support Union mortars and gunboats throughout the operations which wrested control of the Mississippi River and her tributaries from the South, cutting the Confederacy in two.

After the Confederate surrender of Vicksburg Rear Admiral David Dixon Porter praised Judge Torrence and sister ordnance ship Great Western for: "unremitting attention to their duties during the siege, supplying without delay every requisition made on them by Army and Navy." Judge Torrence continued to provide efficient and vital service throughout the war. Judge Torrence decommissioning at Cairo 1 August 1865. She was sold at public auction at Mound City, Illinois, to John A. Williamson et al. 17 August 1865. Redocumented as Amazon 2 January 1866, she served American commerce until she sank after striking a snag off Ozark Island, Arkansas, 19 February 1868.
