= USS Aaron V. Brown =

Gunboat of the United States Navy

History

United States
- Name: USS Aaron V. Brown
- Namesake: Aaron V. Brown
- Ordered: 11 November 1856
- Awarded: 11 November 1856
- Builder: Merry and Grey at Milan, Ohio
- Cost: $6,383
- Completed: June–July 1857
- In service: circa December 1861
- Out of service: 23 August 1864
- Stricken: 1864 (est.)
- Home port: 1857: Milwaukee, Wisconsin; 1862: Salem, Massachusetts; 1863: Beaufort, North Carolina
- Fate: Sold, 1864

General characteristics
- Type: Schooner
- Displacement: 50 tons
- Length: 57 ft 6 in (17.53 m)
- Beam: 17 ft 6 in (5.33 m)
- Draft: 4 ft (1.2 m)
- Propulsion: sail
- Armament: 1 6 pounder cannon

USS Aaron V. Brown was a revenue schooner in the service of the Union Navy during the American Civil War. She was named for United States Postmaster General Aaron V. Brown, the only cutter to bear the name.

== Design and construction ==
On 11 November 1856, the United States Revenue Cutter Service put out a contract for the construction of six shallow-draft cutters for use on the Great Lakes. This contract would be issued to Merry and Grey at Milan, Ohio following their bid of $4,050 for each boat. The design was a scaled down version of a previously 140-ton plan by the Revenue Service. The ship's construction was overseen by a Revenue Service captain and delayed by the onset of winter and a controversy surrounding where certain building materials should originate from. Construction also suffered from a $2,333 cost overrun and a lien issued against the builders, with construction finally being completed between June and July 1857. Compared to her sister ships, Brown was armed with a single six-pounder cannon. Issues regarding the overdue construction was resolved after the revenue service seized the six schooners from the shipbuilders, following the shipyard's debt and a disagreement between the United States Treasury and Ohio financiers regarding the matter.

The ship was made of white oak, yellow pine, locust wood and copper fastenings. She was 57 feet 6 inches (17.53 m) long, had a beam of 17 feet 6 inches (5.33 m) a depth of 5 feet 10 inches (1.78 m), a draft of 4 feet (1.2 m) and had a centerboard which provided stability. The vessel's rounded stern was decorated with eagle figureheads and ornamental shields.

== Service history ==
=== Peacetime ===
Prior to the Civil War, Brown, whose records have for the most part been lost, operated on the Great Lakes from her base at Milwaukee, Wisconsin. As the national crisis deepened after Abraham Lincoln was elected President, Brown was transferred to the Atlantic and, in company with sister ships USRC Cobb, Black, Toucey, and Thompson, arrived at Boston late in December 1861.

=== Civil War service ===
Following a brief assignment at Salem, Massachusetts, she was repaired, provisioned for a deployment in Southern waters, and sailed for the sounds of North Carolina. Here, she operated out of Beaufort, North Carolina for most of 1863. Commanded by Captain John Mason Jr., USRCS, she served in the shoals of those dangerous and bitterly contested waters until May 1864, when she proceeded to New York Harbor to be sold at a cost of $3,700 on 23 August 1864.
