= USS Alonzo Child =

History

United States
- Name: USS Alonzo Child
- Launched: 1857
- In service: circa 25 July 1863
- Out of service: 1865
- Captured: seized by the Union Navy; 19 May 1863
- Fate: Sold, 29 March 1865

General characteristics
- Type: Steamship
- Displacement: 493 long tons (501 t)
- Length: 222 ft (68 m)
- Beam: 36 ft (11 m)
- Depth of hold: 6 ft (1.8 m)
- Propulsion: Steam engine; side wheel-propelled

USS Alonzo Child was a side-wheel steamer seized by the Union Navy during the American Civil War. She was used by the Union Navy as a barracks ship in support of the Union Navy blockade of Confederate waterways.

== Service history ==
Alonzo Child, sometimes referred to as Childs, A. Child, A. Childs, Child, or Childs, was a large side-wheel "river boat" built in 1857 at Jeffersonville, Indiana. During the next few years, she operated out of St. Louis, Missouri, plying the waters of the Mississippi River and its tributaries. One of her pilots was Samuel Clemens, better known as Mark Twain (also see photo). Early in the Civil War, the ship found herself in waters controlled by Confederate forces and, by the end of 1861, was apparently serving the Confederate Government. In any case, on 18 December of that year, the South's Secretary of the Navy, Stephen R. Mallory, authorized payment of $1,000 to her owners for the performance of some now unknown service. It seems that at some time during the ensuing 18 months, title to the steamer passed into the hands of the Confederate Government, but no details of the transaction have been discovered.

In the spring of 1862, when Rear Admiral David Farragut wrested control of the lower Mississippi River from the South, Alonzo Child found temporary safety in the Yazoo River. In December 1862, her engines were removed and taken to Alabama to provide power for one of the Confederate ironclads under construction in that state to assist in the defense of Mobile, Alabama, and ultimately to challenge the Union blockade of that port. The fact that these engines were installed in CSS Tennessee is supported by the Union Navy's inspection of that ironclad ram in August 1864 soon after she surrendered to Rear Admiral Farragut in the closing moments of the Battle of Mobile Bay. "These engines," the board of inspection reported on 13 August 1864, "were taken out of the river steamer called the Alonzo Child."

After losing her engines, the former steamer—now reduced to a barge—remained in the Yazoo River anchored at Yazoo City, Mississippi. As Major General Ulysses S. Grant and Rear Admiral David Dixon Porter increased the tempo of their operations against Vicksburg, the Southern defenders of that strategic Confederate cliff-side fortress filled Alonzo Child with combustibles to ready her for possible use as a fireship and then moved her down stream so that, as an alternative, she might be employed to obstruct the channel of the Yazoo between Haynes and Snyders Bluffs. On 19 May 1863, Lieutenant Commander John Grimes Walker — commanding the ironclad gunboat Baron De Kalb — found her there, abandoned and ". . . much knocked to pieces." She had not been set ablaze and apparently had not been sunk. Walker also found ". . . guns, ammunition, tents, etc. ..." which had been left behind in nearby evacuated Confederate riverbank fortifications. His report of seizing the ". . . 8-inch, 10-inch, and 6-inch rifles ... in these works" has led some historians to conclude mistakenly that Alonzo Child carried these guns.

The damage to the former steamer was apparently only cosmetic for, on 25 July, Porter sent her to Cairo, Illinois, with the recommendation that "she will make a good receiving ship or marine barracks." En route north under tow by Union side-wheeler New National, she came across Sam Young hard aground above the mouth of the White River, "... nearly high and dry" with some 350 captured Confederate soldiers and an armed guard on board. Alonzo Child embarked the prisoners and their guards and carried them to Helena, Arkansas. After reaching Cairo, early in August, the prize was fitted out by the navy yard at Mound City, Illinois, for duty as a receiving ship, and she served there and at Cairo until close to the end of the Civil War. The Union Navy's de facto possession of the former steamer was ratified by the Federal court in Springfield, Illinois, when it condemned Alonzo Child as a lawful prize on 29 March 1864. As Confederate defenses were crumbling throughout the South and the Navy slowly began to demobilize its Mississippi Squadron, Alonzo Child was sold at Mound City on 29 March 1865.

== See also ==
- Confederate States Navy
