= USS O. M. Pettit =

Tugboat of the United States Navy

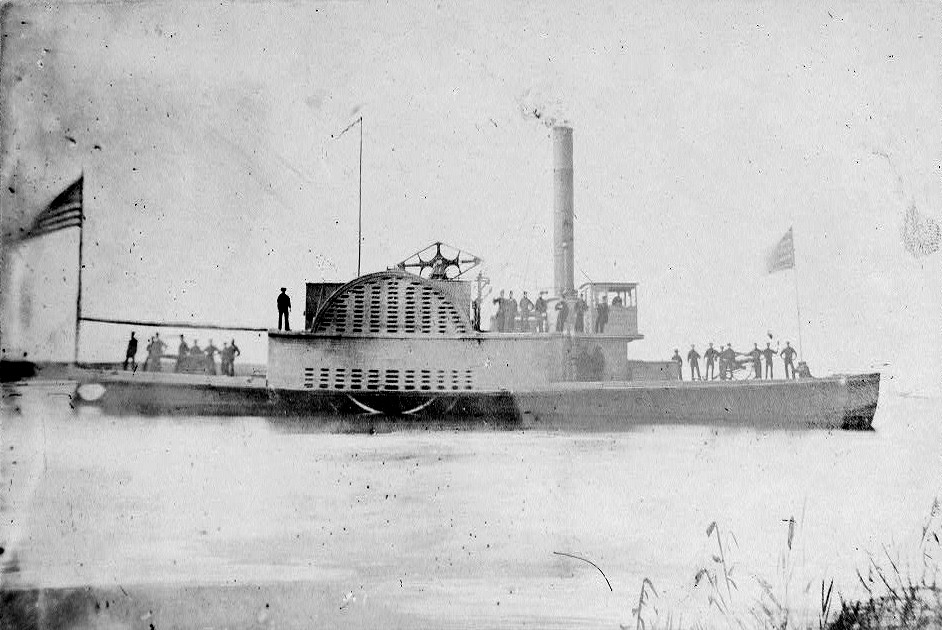
- USS O. M. Pettit, ca. 1860s, location unknown

History

United States
- Name: USS O. M. Pettit
- Launched: 1857
- Acquired: 17 August 1861
- Commissioned: 4 October 1861
- Decommissioned: 1865
- Fate: Sold 2 September 1865; Abandoned by commercial owners 1879

General characteristics
- Type: tug
- Displacement: 165 tons
- Length: 106 ft (32 m)
- Beam: 28 ft 4 in (8.64 m)
- Draft: 6 ft (1.8 m)
- Depth of hold: 7 ft (2.1 m)
- Propulsion: Steam engine, sidewheel
- Speed: 8 knots (15 km/h; 9.2 mph)
- Armament: 1 × 30-pounder gun; 1 × 20-pounder Parrott rifle

USS O. M. Pettit was a steamer acquired by the Union Navy during the American Civil War. She was used by the Navy as a tugboat to service Union Navy ships blockading ports of the Confederate States of America.

== Service history ==
Oliver M. Pettit was a wooden sidewheel paddle steamer built in 1857 at Williamsburg, New York. The United States Navy purchased her at New York City on 17 August 1861 and commissioned her at the New York Navy Yard in Brooklyn, New York, on 4 October 1861, as USS O. M. Pettit.

After serving as a tug at the New York Navy Yard, the O. M. Petit joined the South Atlantic Blockading Squadron early in 1862 for service in the Union blockade of the Confederate States of America. She performed similar services at Port Royal, South Carolina.

On 24 April 1865, as the American Civil War came to a close, O. M. Petit sank in the Savannah River near Hammond, Georgia. She was refloated, repaired, and returned to service.

After the American Civil War, O. M. Pettit was sold at Bay Point in Charleston Harbor, South Carolina, on 2 September 1865 to J. W. Walcott. She was abandoned in 1879.
