= USS Howell Cobb =

Revenue Cutter/US Navy schooner

History

United States
- Acquired: 10 June 1861
- In service: circa June 1861
- Out of service: circa July 1862
- Fate: Returned to the United States Coast Survey

General characteristics
- Type: Schooner
- Propulsion: Sails

USS Howell Cobb was a schooner acquired on an emergency temporary basis by the United States Navy from the United States Coast Survey for service during the American Civil War. She served as a cargo ship in Union Navy service.

== Design and construction ==
On 11 November 1856, the United States Revenue Cutter Service put out a contract for the construction of six shallow-draft cutters for use on the Great Lakes. This contract would be issued to Merry and Grey at Milan, Ohio following their bid of $4,050 for each boat. The design was a scaled down version of a previously 140-ton plan by the Revenue Service. The ship's construction was overseen by a Revenue Service captain and delayed by the onset of winter and a controversy surrounding where certain building materials should originate from. Construction also suffered from a $2,333 cost overrun and a lien issued against the builders, with construction finally being completed between June and July 1857. Compared to her sister ship USRC Aaron V. Brown, Howell Cobb was unarmed. Issues regarding the overdue construction was resolved after the revenue service seized the six schooners from the shipbuilders, following the shipyard's debt and a disagreement between the United States Treasury and Ohio financiers regarding the matter.

The ship was made of white oak, yellow pine, locust wood and copper fastenings. She was 57 feet 6 inches (17.53 m) long, had a beam of 17 feet 6 inches (5.33 m) a depth of 5 feet 10 inches (1.78 m), a draft of 4 feet (1.2 m) and had a centerboard which provided stability. The vessel's rounded stern was decorated with eagle figureheads and ornamental shields.

== Service history ==
Howell Cobb, a United States Coast Survey schooner operated as a survey ship, was taken over by the U.S. Navy on 10 June 1861 by Commander J. H. Ward, commanding the Union Navy′s Potomac River Flotilla. Her first commanding officer was Acting Master's Mate A. J. Frank. She was placed into Navy service as a cargo ship assigned to support the Potomac River Flotilla on the Potomac River.

Howell Cobb was actively employed on the Potomac River in convoys bringing supplies to the Union Army in and around Washington, D.C. This was vital service at a time when rail traffic north of Washington had been cut off by riots in Baltimore, Maryland. She also was engaged, in Breton's Bay and vicinity, in suppressing illegal trade along the shores of the Potomac.

She was sent to the Philadelphia Navy Yard in Philadelphia, Pennsylvania, for repairs, arriving there on 9 July 1862. She did not return to active service in the Civil War, and later was returned to the U.S. Coast Survey.

== See also ==
- Union Navy
- Confederate States Navy
