= USS New National =

History

United States
- Laid down: date unknown
- Launched: date unknown
- Commissioned: circa June 1862
- Decommissioned: 12 April 1865
- Stricken: 1865 (est.)
- Captured: seized by the Union Navy; 6 June 1862
- Fate: Returned to her owner

General characteristics
- Displacement: 1,000 tons
- Length: not known
- Beam: not known
- Draught: not known
- Propulsion: steam engine; side wheel-propelled
- Speed: not known
- Complement: not known
- Armament: one 12-pounder rifle

USS New National was a large side wheel steamer seized by the Union Navy during the American Civil War. She was used by the Union Navy as a troop ship and receiving ship in support of the Union Navy blockade of Confederate waterways.

== New National seized by the Union Navy at Memphis ==
New National, a wooden side-wheel steamer, was seized by Union Navy gunboats at Memphis, Tennessee, 6 June 1862, after they had destroyed the Confederate River Defense Fleet.

=== Placed into Union service as a troop ship ===
Placed in service as a transport, First Master A. M. Grant in command, for the U.S. War Department's Western Flotilla, New National carried troops in a joint expedition to St. Charles, Arkansas, where they landed 17 June, stormed Southern earthworks, and won control of the White River for the Union fleet.

=== Officially transferred to the Navy as a receiving ship ===
Transferred from the War Department to the Navy 30 September 1862, New National served as a receiving ship and as a mail and supply boat for the Mississippi Squadron.

=== Returned to owner and chartered by the Union Navy ===
Returned to her owner, Pearson Montgomery, at the intervention of U.S. Secretary of the Treasury Salmon P. Chase, 21 March 1863, she was simultaneously chartered by the Navy and kept in service.

=== Supporting the capture of Yazoo City ===
After the fall of Vicksburg, she participated in the expedition which captured Yazoo City, Mississippi, 13 July 1863.

== Decommissioning post-war, and return to owner ==
Following service maintaining Union communication and supply lines on the Mississippi River and its tributaries through the end of the Civil War, New National decommissioned at Mound City, Illinois, 12 April 1865 and was returned to her owner.

== See also ==
- Confederate States Navy
- Anaconda Plan
