= HMS Jaseur (1857) =

Gunboat of the Royal Navy

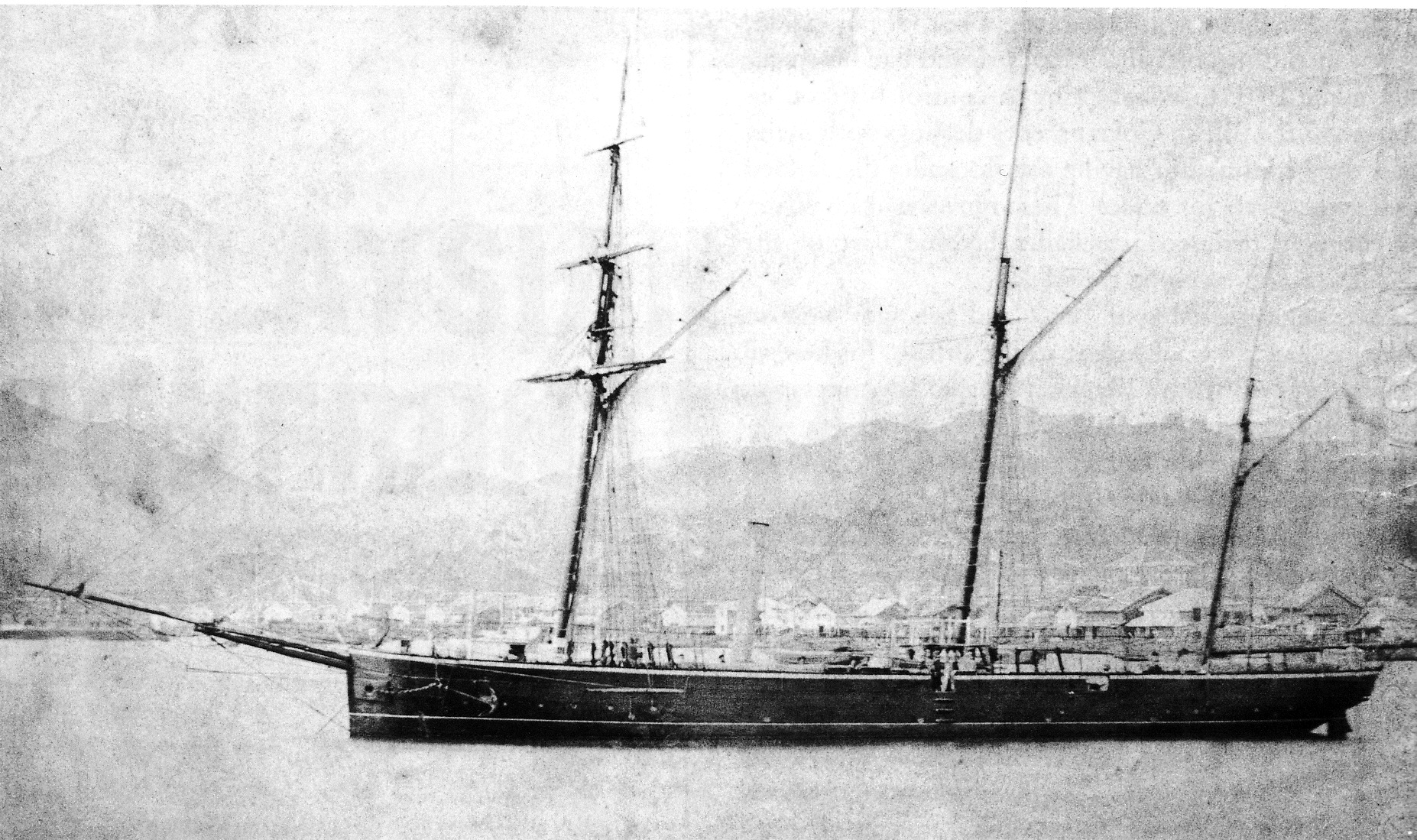
- Leven, sister-ship to Jaseur

History

United Kingdom
- Name: HMS Jaseur
- Ordered: 22 September 1856
- Builder: R & H Green, Blackwall Yard
- Cost: Hull £5,668, machinery £4,350 (Jaseur) (Note: A total cost accounting for inflation of approximately £932,800 in today's money.)
- Launched: 7 March 1857
- Commissioned: 5 September 1857
- Fate: Wrecked, 26 February 1859

General characteristics
- Class & type: Algerine-class gunboat
- Displacement: 370 tons
- Tons burthen: 300 88/94 bm
- Length: 125 ft 0 in (38.1 m) (gundeck); 110 ft 1.5 in (33.6 m) (keel)
- Beam: 23 ft 0 in (7.0 m)
- Depth of hold: 9 ft 3 in (2.8 m)
- Installed power: 80 nominal horsepower; 301 ihp (224 kW)
- Propulsion: 2-cylinder horizontal direct-acting single-expansion steam engine; Single (hoisting) screw
- Sail plan: Schooner (or "gunboat") rig
- Speed: 9 kn (17 km/h; 10 mph)
- Armament: 1 × 8-inch (200 mm) 68-pounder (87cwt) muzzle-loading smoothbore gun (Note: In some ships a 10-inch (250 mm) muzzle-loading smoothbore gun was fitted instead of the 8-inch gun.); 2 × 24-pounder howitzers

HMS Jaseur was an Algerine-class gunboat launched in 1857. She served on the North America and West Indies station for less than two years before her loss by stranding on the Bajo Nuevo Bank in the Caribbean on 26 February 1859.

== Design ==
Developed during the Crimean War as an enlarged version of W. H. Walker's Albacore class, the Algerines were an acknowledgement that gunboats designed for coastal operations would inevitably be called upon to act in a cruising role, both in shallow and in deeper water. Their increased size gave them much improved accommodation, and in general they were effective vessels.

=== Armament ===
As built, they were armed with one 8-inch (200 mm) 68-pounder (87cwt) muzzle-loading smoothbore gun and two 24-pounder howitzers.

=== Propulsion ===
Jaseur was fitted with a 2-cylinder horizontal direct-acting single-expansion steam engine manufactured by Maudslay, Sons & Field. (Note: The cost of this marine steam engine was £4,350, or adjusting for inflation, £405,000 in today's prices.) This engine drove a single screw, which for the first time in a gunboat was provided with a hoisting mechanism; this ensured a better performance under sail than previous classes. Her engine developed 80 nominal horsepower (a designed indicated horsepower of 301 ihp (224 kW)). The design speed under steam was 9 knots (17 km/h).

=== Rig ===
Fitted at first with a simple schooner rig (often known as a "gunboat rig" in the Royal Navy), the use of these vessels as cruisers encouraged commanding officers on far-flung stations to augment their sail area by fitting topmasts and yards, making them barquentines.

== Construction ==
Ordered on 22 September 1856, she was laid down at the Blackwall Yard premises of R & H Green. She was launched on 7 March 1857, and her first (and only) commanding officer, Lieutenant John Binney Scott joined on 28 July 1857. She commissioned on 5 September 1857 for the North America and West Indies station.

== Operational service ==
Service on the North America and West Indies station in the late 1850s involved deterring the slave trade on the western side of the Atlantic. Although there was considerable activity in chasing and examining potential slavers, it was rare to find a vessel engaged in the slave trade which could be legally detained. Jaseur had already boarded 3 vessels during March 1858 when the Commodore at Jamaica directed that his ships (Styx, Basilisk, Jaseur, Jasper, Skipjack and Forward) were to "be kept actively employed in cruizing round Cuba for the suppression of the slave trade". She arrived in Havana in July 1858 for coal, departing the same day for Tampico. In October 1858, Jaseur and Kite assisted in the search for the American barque Parthian, which was reported to be in distress off Bermuda. The President of the United States later transmitted his thanks to the officers and crews of both vessels.

== Fate ==
Jaseur was lost on the Bajo Nuevo Bank 200 miles south-east of Jamaica (Note: Approximately in position 15°51′N 78°38′W) on 26 February 1859 on passage from Port Royal to San Juan de Nicaragua (Note: Known as Greytown in 1859.) while under the command of Lieutenant Scott. All personnel on board were saved. Her stores were recovered in April by Cuba or Zelinda, tender to HMS Imaum, the receiving ship at Jamaica.
