= USS Wanderer (1857) =

Gunboat of the United States Navy

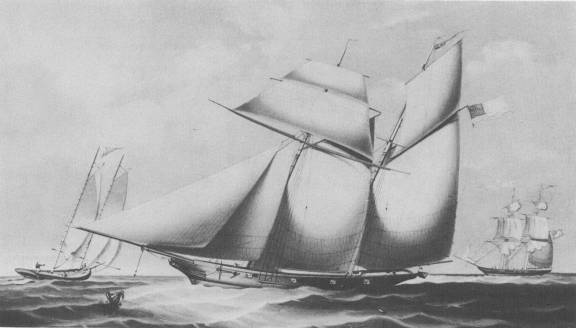
- USS Wanderer in U.S. Navy service during the American Civil War (1861–1865).

History

United States
- Name: USS Wanderer
- Namesake: Previous name retained
- Launched: 1857
- Acquired: May 1861
- Commissioned: ca. May 1863
- In service: May or June 1861 – July 1863 and spring 1864 – June 1865
- Out of service: July 1863-spring 1864
- Stricken: 1865
- Fate: Sold 28 June 1865
- Notes: In mercantile and slave trade service 1857–1861; In mercantile service 1865–1871; Lost 21 January 1871

General characteristics
- Displacement: 300 tons
- Length: 106 ft 0 in (32.31 m)
- Beam: 25 ft 6 in (7.77 m)
- Draught: 9 ft 6 in (2.90 m)
- Propulsion: Sails
- Sail plan: Schooner-rigged
- Speed: 20 knots (37 km/h)
- Complement: not known
- Armament: 1 × 20-pounder Parrott rifle; 2 × 24-pounder Dahlgren howitzers

The first USS Wanderer was a high-speed schooner originally built for pleasure. It was used in 1858 to illegally import slaves from Africa. It was seized for service with the United States Navy during the American Civil War. In U.S. Navy service from 1861 to 1865, and under outright U.S. Navy ownership from 1863 to 1865, she was used by the Union Navy as a gunboat, as a tender, and as a hospital ship. She was decommissioned, put into merchant use, and lost off Cuba in 1871.

== Construction and private ownership ==
Wanderer—a schooner-rigged yacht built in 1857 in the shipyard of Joseph Rowland at Setauket on Long Island, New York by Thomas B. Hawkins—was designed as a pleasure boat and build for speed. She was originally owned by Colonel John Johnson of New York City and Louisiana.

After Johnson sailed the boat for a cruise down the Atlantic coast and to the Gulf of Mexico, during which he visited Charleston, South Carolina, Brunswick, Georgia, Key West, Florida, and New Orleans, Louisiana, Wanderer returned to New York City. Johnson soon sold the ship to William C. Corrie of Charleston, South Carolina.

== Service in the slave trade ==
Wanderer's new owner had several alterations made to the ship at Port Jefferson, New York, some of which—particularly the installation of tanks which could hold 15,000 US gallons (57,000 L) of fresh water—suggested that Wanderer was being fitted out as a slave ship. These concerns were brought to the authorities in New York City by Port Jefferson's Custom House officer. As the Wanderer was attempting to leave Port Jefferson harbor New York Harbor, she was seized as a suspected slaver on 9 June 1858 by the steam revenue cutter USRC Harriet Lane of the United States Revenue Cutter Service, which was awaiting her departure. She was towed to Manhattan Island, and anchored near the Battery.

The next morning, United States Government officials inspected the schooner and found that—while her extremely fast lines and her equipment and provisions would be valuable assets should she enter the slave trade—there was no conclusive evidence of intent to engage in slaving on the part of her owner, her master, or crew.

Wanderer was thus free to clear port, and she sailed for Charleston, South Carolina, where she arrived on 25 June 1858. There, her fitting out as a slave ship was completed before she got underway for Port-of-Spain, Trinidad, on 3 July 1858.

Wanderer left Port-of-Spain on 27 July 1858, crossed the Atlantic Ocean to Africa, and entered the Congo River on 16 September 1858. Braving an epidemic of yellow fever which was then raging in the Congo, she took on board about 500 Kikongo speaking captives and sailed for North America on 18 October 1858. She was chased briefly by the U.S. Navy sloop-of-war USS Vincennes as she left the mouth of the river but quickly outdistanced Vincennes. At the end of a six-week voyage in which many of the captives died, Wanderer arrived at Jekyll Island, Georgia, on 28 November 1858 and delivered her human cargo.

Word of Wanderer's arrival quickly spread, and a great deal of litigation ensued—both civil and criminal—but resulted in no convictions. During the next two years, ownership of the vessel changed several times and, on one occasion, the ship was stolen and taken to sea on a piratical and slaving voyage. Near the coast of Africa, the first mate led a mutiny and left the pirate captain at sea in a small boat before bringing the ship back to Boston, Massachusetts on 24 December 1859 and turning her over to authorities there.

== Seized by the United States Government ==
A week before the outbreak of the American Civil War, Wanderer, registered to owners in the southern United States then seceding to form the Confederate States of America, arrived in Key West, Florida, from Havana, Cuba, on 5 April 1861. She was caught in that port during the Confederate bombardment of Fort Sumter on 12 April 1861 and confiscated by the United States Government in May 1861 to prevent her from being used by the Confederacy as a privateer.

=== Support to the United States Navy ===
Operating out of Key West from 27 June 1861, Wanderer carried wood, coal, water, and mail to the vessels of the Gulf Blockading Squadron. On 30 November 1861, she stopped the British schooner Telegraph off Key Vaccas, Florida. Upon examination of Telegraph's papers, Wanderer released the British schooner, but the incident nevertheless prompted a diplomatic protest from the British government on 8 March 1862.

When Union naval forces were divided on 20 January 1862, Wanderer was assigned to the newly formed East Gulf Blockading Squadron. She continued provisioning and dispatch duties, operating between Tortugas, Florida, Havana, Cuba, and Cape San Antonio, Cuba.

In early July 1862, Wanderer patrolled off Indian River and Jupiter Inlet, Florida, in search of possible blockade running activity but found none. In October 1862, she was assigned to the blockade of St. Andrews Bay. Florida.

By 1 January 1863, Wanderer had returned to Key West for re-coppering and cruised between Saint Marks and Cedar Key, Florida, in early March 1863. Accompanied by Ezilda, she captured the sloop Ranger off Cedar Keys on 25 March 1863. Wanderer also captured the schooner Annie B. and her cargo of cotton on 17 April 1863 off Egmont Key, Florida. On 30 April 1863, Wanderer proceeded to Key West for extensive repairs to her hull and spars.

=== Under U.S. Navy ownership ===
Meanwhile, legal action against Wanderer was slowly taking place in the United States, and she was condemned by the Philadelphia, Pennsylvania, prize court in May 1863 and was simultaneously purchased by the United States Navy.

Wanderer left Key West early in May for patrol duty west of Tortugas. She stopped in Tampa Bay, Florida, in June 1863 and had returned to Key West by 15 July 1863 for refit as a hospital ship. She remained in ordinary through the autumn of 1863 and winter of 1863–1864 undergoing alterations to prepare her for this new role, and she was ready in the spring of 1864. However, hot and humid weather brought an epidemic of yellow fever to Key West during June and July 1864. All crewmen on board Wanderer sickened, and one died. The vessel spent the remaining months of 1864 at Key West as a guard ship.

== Post-war decommissioning, sale and subsequent commercial career ==
Wanderer deteriorated rapidly during her relative inactivity. On 1 June 1865, shortly after the end of hostilities, Rear Admiral Cornelius K. Stribling, commanding the East Gulf Blockading Squadron, advised that Wanderer not be sent north for disposal because of her unseaworthy condition. She was sold at public auction on 28 June 1865 at Key West by A. Patterson to Packer and Watson. She subsequently entered the banana trade and operated in mercantile service until lost off Cape Maisí, Cuba, on 21 January 1871.

== See also ==
- Wanderer (slave ship) - the ship as a slave ship
- Blockade runners of the American Civil War
- Blockade mail of the Confederacy
