= USRC Black =

Revenue Cutter

History

United States
- Ordered: 11 November 1856
- Awarded: 11 November 1856
- Builder: Merry and Grey at Milan, Ohio
- Cost: $6,383
- Completed: June–July 1857
- Decommissioned: 9 January 1868
- Home port: 1857: Erie, Pennsylvania; 1861: Boston, Massachusetts; 1860s: Eastport, Maine; 1866: Edgartown, Massachusetts; 1867: Philadelphia, Pennsylvania
- Fate: Sold, 1868

General characteristics
- Type: Schooner
- Displacement: 50 tons
- Length: 57 ft 6 in (17.53 m)
- Beam: 17 ft 6 in (5.33 m)
- Draft: 4 ft (1.2 m)
- Propulsion: sail

USRC Black, also known as the Jeremiah S. Black, was a lead of her class schooner built for and operated by the United States Revenue Cutter Service, in service from 1857 to 1868. She is the only revenue cutter to bear the name.

== Design and construction ==
On 11 November 1856, the United States Revenue Cutter Service put out a contract for the construction of six shallow-draft cutters for use on the Great Lakes. This contract would be issued to Merry and Grey at Milan, Ohio, following their bid of $4,050 for each boat. The design was a scaled down version of a previously 140-ton plan by the Revenue Service. The ship's construction was overseen by a Revenue Service captain and delayed by the onset of winter and a controversy surrounding where certain building materials should originate from. Construction also suffered from a $2,333 cost overrun and a lien issued against the builders, with construction finally being completed between June and July 1857. Compared to sister ship USRC Brown's single six-pounder cannon, the Black was unarmed. Issues regarding the overdue construction was resolved after the revenue service seized the six schooners from the shipbuilders, following the shipyard's debt and a disagreement between the United States Treasury and Ohio financiers regarding the matter.

The ship was made of white oak, yellow pine, locust wood and copper fastenings. She was 57 feet 6 inches (17.53 m) long, had a beam of 17 feet 6 inches (5.33 m) a depth of 5 feet 10 inches (1.78 m), a draft of 4 feet (1.2 m) and had a centerboard which provided stability. The vessel's rounded stern was decorated with eagle figureheads and ornamental shields.

The hull was named for Jeremiah S. Black on 29 August 1857 who was the sitting Attorney General of President James Buchanan's cabinet.

== Service history ==
After her entry into service, the Black was first stationed at Erie, Pennsylvania, along the Great Lakes. In November 1861 she was stationed to Boston, Massachusetts, transiting the Great Lakes via Quebec in December alongside sisterships USRC Cobb, Brown, Toucey, and Thompson. The American Civil War would see her transferred to Eastport, Maine, before Edgartown, Massachusetts, in 1866. In 1867 she was ordered to Philadelphia, Pennsylvania, where she was laid up on 9 January 1868. She is listed as being sold the same year.
