= HMS Jasper (1857) =

British Algerine-class gunboat

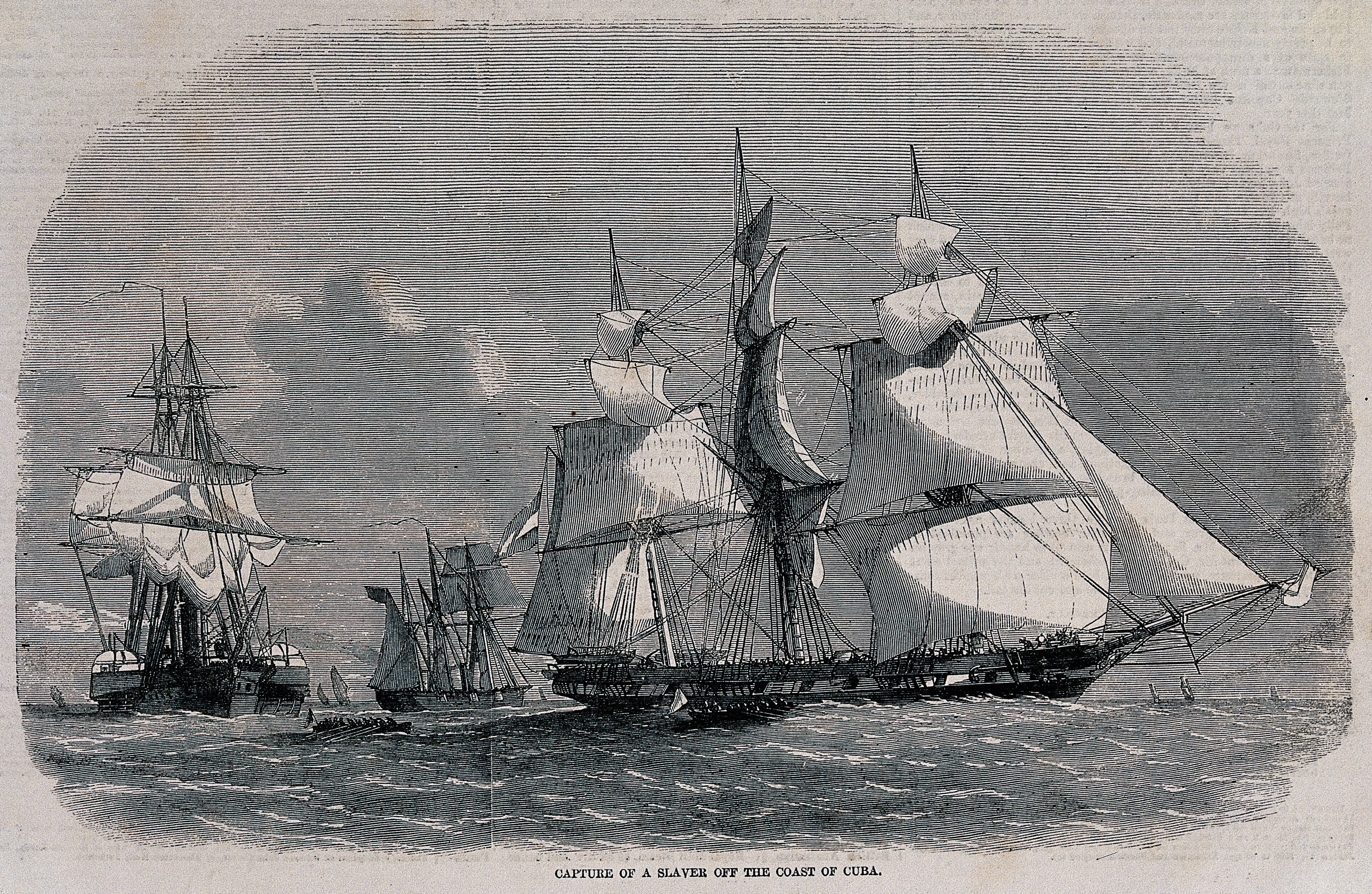
- HM ships Styx and Jasper capture the slaver Emilia off the Coast of Cuba on 22 March 1858

History

United Kingdom
- Name: HMS Jasper
- Ordered: 22 September 1856
- Builder: R & H Green, Blackwall Yard
- Laid down: 26 September 1856
- Launched: 18 March 1857
- Commissioned: 28 July 1857
- Fate: Sold, 2 August 1862

Lay-Osborn Flotilla
- Name: Amoy (廈門); Kuang Wan (廣萬)
- Namesake: Amoy
- Acquired: 2 August 1862
- Decommissioned: 1863

General characteristics
- Class & type: Algerine-class gunboat
- Displacement: 370 long tons (376 t)
- Tons burthen: 301 bm
- Length: 125 ft 0 in (38.1 m)
- Beam: 23 ft 0 in (7.01 m)
- Draught: 9 ft 2 in (2.8 m)
- Installed power: 80 nhp; 299 hp (223 kW)
- Propulsion: Single shaft
- Speed: 9 knots (17 km/h; 10 mph)
- Armament: 1 × 8-inch (200 mm) 68-pounder (87cwt) muzzle-loading smoothbore gun; 2 × 24-pounder howitzers

HMS Jasper was a British Algerine-class gunboat launched in 1857.

== History ==
HMS Jasper was launched on 18 March 1857. It was commissioned on 28 July under Lieut. William Henry Pym and served in the North America and West Indies Station. Her notable actions included the capture of United States slave vessel Emilia (aka Marianna) with HMS Styx off the north coast of Cuba on 22 March 1858. Emilia was towed to Port Royal by Jasper. The capture of a US vessel ignited a diplomatic crisis between Great Britain and the United States, though it was later resolved when Great Britain agreed not to search US vessels.

On 2 August 1862, Jasper was purchased by Horatio Nelson Lay, Inspector General of the Qing Dynasty Chinese Maritime Customs Service, as part of an effort to bolster the Qing Dynasty naval force in response to the ongoing Taiping Rebellion. Thereafter she was renamed Amoy (Chinese: 廈門; pinyin: Xiàmén; Wade–Giles: Hsia Men; lit. 'Amoy'), and became part of the Lay-Osborn Flotilla commanded by Sherard Osborn. She was put under the command of Lieut. Arthur Salwey, and sailed for China in April 1863. Upon her arrival in Tianjin, the Qing government ordered the ship to be renamed as Kuang Wan (Chinese: 廣萬; pinyin: Guǎngwàn).

Disagreements between the Qing government and Lay over the command and composition of the Lay-Osborn Flotilla led to its disbandment in 1863, and Amoy was taken to Bombay by Osborn, presumably for sale. There are conflicting accounts of her fate. She was possibly sold to Egypt on 30 December 1865, or to Captain Charles Stuart Forbes of Keangsoo. One Chinese source indicated that it was eventually sold to Satsuma Domain with Keangsoo.
