= Algerine-class gunboat =

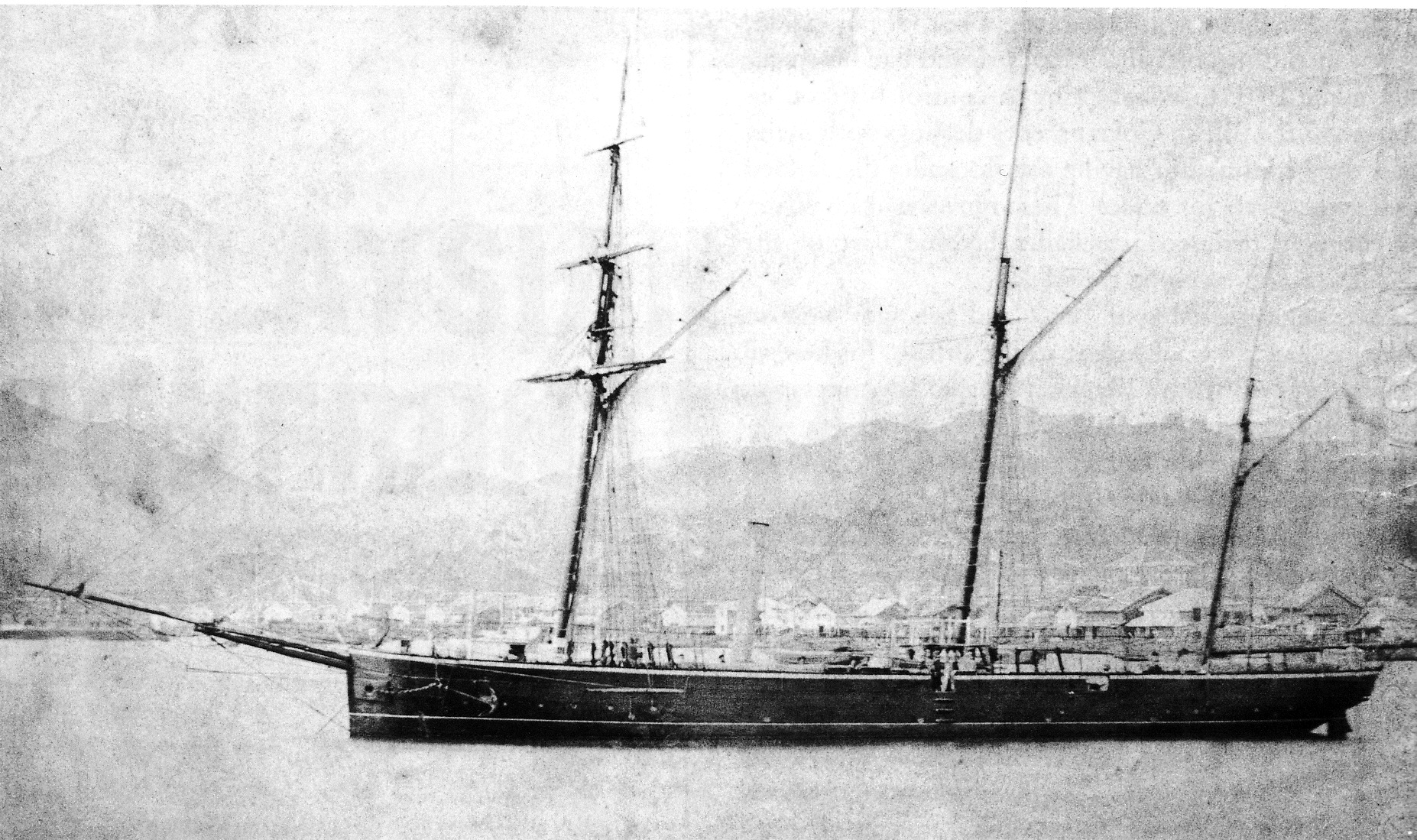
- Leven rigged as a barquentine

Class overview
- Name: Algerine-class gunboat
- Builders: R & H Green, Blackwall Yard; W. & H. Pitcher, Northfleet
- Operators: Royal Navy; British Merchant Navy; (Qing dynasty) Chinese Imperial Customs; (Ottoman Empire) Egyptian Government
- Preceded by: Albacore class
- Succeeded by: Britomart class
- Cost: Hull £5,668, machinery £4,350 (Jaseur) (Note: A total cost accounting for inflation of approximately £1,182,500 in today's money.)
- Built: 1856–1857
- In commission: 1857–1873
- Completed: 6
- Lost: 3
- Retired: 3

General characteristics
- Type: Wooden screw gunboat (gunvessels from 1859)
- Displacement: 370 tons
- Tons burthen: 300 88/94 bm
- Length: 125 ft 0 in (38.1 m) (gundeck); 110 ft 1.5 in (33.6 m) (keel)
- Beam: 23 ft 0 in (7.0 m)
- Depth of hold: 9 ft 3 in (2.8 m)
- Installed power: 80 nominal horsepower; 294 ihp (219 kW)
- Propulsion: 2-cylinder horizontal direct-acting single-expansion steam engine; Single (hoisting) screw
- Sail plan: As built: Schooner (or "gunboat") rig; Later: Often a barquentine rig
- Speed: 9 kn (17 km/h)
- Armament: As built: 1 × 8-inch (200 mm) 68-pounder (87cwt) muzzle-loading smoothbore gun; (in some ships a 10-inch muzzle-loading smoothbore gun instead); 2 × 24-pounder howitzers; By 1863: 1 × 110-pounder Armstrong breech-loading gun; 1 × 40-pounder Armstrong breech-loading gun

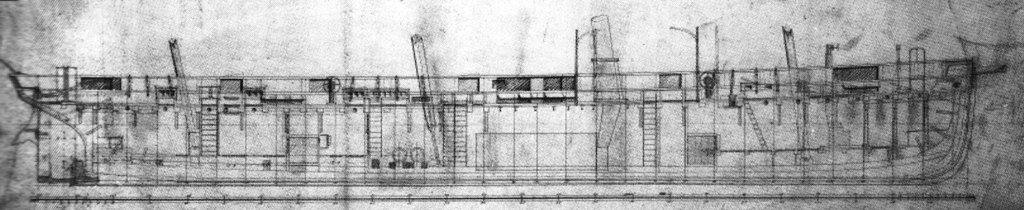
Design profile for the Algerine class

The Algerine-class gunboats were a class of six 3-gun wooden gunboats (reclassified as gunvessels from 1859) built for the Royal Navy in 1857. A further pair were built in India for the Bombay Marine in 1859.

An enlarged version of the very numerous Albacore class, they reflected the change in use from coastal operations towards deep-water cruising, but were delivered too late to see action in the Crimean War. They were the first class of Royal Navy gunboat to incorporate a hoisting screw, which gave them improved performance under sail. The last man hung from the yardarm in the Royal Navy was a Royal Marine executed on 13 July 1860 in Leven.

== Design and construction ==
Developed during the Crimean War as an enlarged version of W. H. Walker's Albacore class, the Algerines were an acknowledgement that gunboats designed for coastal operations would inevitably be called upon to act in a cruising role, both in shallow and in deeper water. Their increased size gave them much improved accommodation, and in general they were effective vessels, leading to the construction of two identical vessels for the Bombay Marine.

=== Armament ===
As built, they were armed with one 8-inch (200 mm) 68-pounder (87 cwt) muzzle-loading smoothbore gun (Note: In some ships a 10-inch (250 mm) muzzle-loading smoothbore gun was fitted instead of the 8-inch gun.) and two 24-pounder howitzers. By 1863 the three surviving vessels of the class were armed with one 110-pounder Armstrong breech-loading gun and one 40-pounder Armstrong breech-loading gun.

=== Propulsion ===
The class were each fitted with a 2-cylinder horizontal direct-acting single-expansion steam engine manufactured by Maudslay, Sons & Field. (Note: The cost of these marine steam engines was £4,350, or adjusting for inflation, £513,500 in today's prices.) This engine drove a single screw, which for the first time in a gunboat was provided with a hoisting mechanism; this ensured a better performance under sail than previous classes. These engines were rated at 80 nominal horsepower and produced on trials 294 indicated horsepower (219 kW). The design speed under steam was 9 knots (17 km/h).

=== Rig ===
Fitted at first with a simple schooner rig (often known as a "gunboat rig" in the Royal Navy), the use of these vessels as cruisers encouraged commanding officers on far-flung stations to augment their sail area by fitting topmasts and yards, making them barquentines. (Note: The picture of Leven at the head of this article shows a vessel of the class rigged as a barquentine.)

== Operational lives ==
Jaseur was lost on the Bajo Nuevo Bank in the Caribbean Sea within two years of her launch, having spent the whole of her short career on the North America and West Indies station, mostly in deterring the slave trade. Jasper also served on the West Indies station before being sold to the Chinese in 1863 to form part of Sherard Osborn's Vampire Fleet. When the venture was called off, she was sold to Egypt to prevent her purchase by the Confederate Navy. Algerine spent her entire career on the China station, and was present at the capture of Canton in 1857. Lee was also sent to the China station, but her career was abruptly curtailed on 25 June 1859 when she was sunk at the second battle of the Taku Forts. Leven, like Lee and Algerine served on the China station, and took part in the successful first battle of the Taku Forts. The last man hanged from the yardarm in the Royal Navy was a Royal Marine, executed for attempted murder on 13 July 1860 in Leven. Slaney served with Algerine at the capture of Canton and with Leven at the first battle of the Taku Forts.

== Ships ==
Name	Ship Builder	Launched	Fate
Jaseur	R & H Green, Blackwall Yard	7 March 1857	Wrecked on the Bajo Nuevo Bank on 26 February 1859, whilst on passage from Port Royal to Greytown, Nicaragua
Jasper	R & H Green, Blackwall Yard	18 March 1857	Sold on 2 August 1862 to the Chinese Imperial Customs, renamed Amoy, and sailed in April 1863 (to join Sherard Osborn's "Vampire Fleet"). Resold to the Egyptian Government on 30 December 1865
Algerine	W & H Pitcher, Northfleet	24 February 1857	Sold at Hong Kong on 2 April 1872, became the mercantile Algerine. Broken up in 1894.
Lee	W & H Pitcher, Northfleet	28 February 1857	Sunk at the Battle of Taku Forts on 25 June 1859
Leven	W & H Pitcher, Northfleet	7 March 1857	Sold at Shanghai on 21 July 1873
Slaney	W & H Pitcher, Northfleet	17 March 1857	Wrecked in a typhoon in the Paracel Islands near Hong Kong on 9 May 1870

== Bombay Marine versions ==
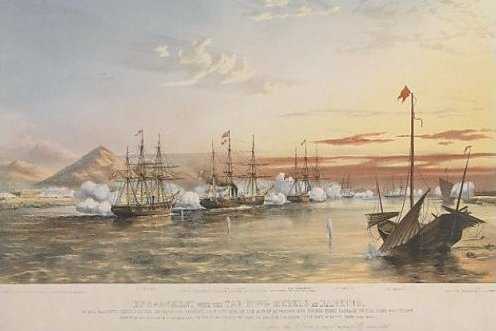
Lee in action against the Taiping, 20 November 1858

Having proved their worth in the Royal Navy, two copies were built of teak at Bombay for the Bombay Marine.

Name	Ship Builder	Launched	Fate
Clyde	Bombay	1859	
Sir Hugh Rose	Bombay	1860	1876?
