= USS Great Western =

Ammunition ship of the United States Navy

History

United States
- Laid down: date unknown
- Launched: 1857
- Acquired: 30 September 1862
- In service: c. 10 February 1862
- Out of service: c. March 1865
- Stricken: 1865 (est.)
- Fate: Sold, 29 November 1865

General characteristics
- Displacement: 429 tons
- Length: not known
- Beam: not known
- Draught: not known
- Propulsion: steam engine; side wheel-propelled
- Speed: 6 knots (est.)
- Complement: not known
- Armament: one 12-pounder gun; one 32-pounder gun; one 6-pounder gun

USS Great Western was a steamer acquired by the Union Navy during the American Civil War. She was used as an ammunition ship in support of the Union Navy.

== Purchased for use as an ammunition ship ==
Great Western, a sidewheel steamer, was built at Cincinnati, Ohio, in 1857 and was purchased by the U.S. War Department 10 February 1862. She was transferred to the Union Navy 30 September 1862, but had been used since her purchase by the Western Flotilla.

== Supplying Union ships on the Mississippi with ammunition ==
Great Western was used as an ordnance boat for the Navy on the western waters, and in that capacity operated from Cairo, Illinois, to various points on the Mississippi River and its tributaries. She supplied ships at the mouths of the White and Arkansas Rivers with ammunition and ordnance, and occasionally fired at Confederate batteries ashore in the almost daily engagements in keeping open the far-spreading river highway system by which the Union divided and destroyed the South.

While with the Mortar Flotilla 30 July 1862 she fired on cavalry attacking the boats near the mouth of the Arkansas River and succeeded in driving them off.

== Supporting Vicksburg campaign operations ==
During 1862 and the first half of 1863, the overriding concern of Union forces was the capture of Vicksburg, and Great Western spent much of her time during this period near the mouth of the Yazoo River above the city in support of combined operations there.

== Post-Vicksburg campaign operations ==
She provided support for the joint attacks of December 1862 above the city, and remained in the area until the Confederate stronghold fell in July 1863. Following the fall of Vicksburg, Great Western continued her duties as supply ship for the squadron, being stationed at Skipwith's Landing, Mississippi, and Goodrich's Landing, Louisiana. In July 1864 she was sent back to Cairo, Illinois, to act as a receiving ship.

== Post-war decommissioning and sale ==
Great Western was transferred as receiving ship, Mound City, Illinois, in March 1865, and was subsequently sold at auction there to John Riley on 29 November 1865.
