= Intrepid (ship) =

Several vessels have been named Intrepid:

== Commercial/private ships ==
- Intrepid (1787 ship) was launched in 1776, almost surely under another name. She appeared as Intrepid in British records from 1787; missing volumes of Lloyd's Register (LR) and missing pages in extant records obscure her earlier name(s) and history. She made one voyage as a whaler and two as a slave ship. She also captured a Spanish merchant ship. Otherwise she traded widely as a West Indiaman, transport, and to North and South America. She was wrecked in November 1816.
- Intrepid (1809 ship) was launched in Newcastle upon Tyne. She then became a transport. In 1820 she made a voyage to Bengal, sailing under a license from the British East India Company (EIC). She then reverted to being a transport. She was wrecked on 5 January 1826.
- Intrepid (1829 ship) was launched at Whitby in 1829. She traded with Quebec in 1830, later carrying migrants to Canada. She was lost at Colombo in 1834.
- Intrepid (yacht), a racing yacht that won the America's Cup.

== Military ships ==
- HCS Intrepid (1780) – a snow belonging to the Bombay Marine, the naval arm of the British East India Company, that participated in the capture of Malacca on 17 August 1795 and that had an inconclusive engagement with a French privateer off Muscat on 22 November 1800. She foundered without a trace in late 1800 or early 1801.
- HMS Intrepid – any one of eight vessels of the British Royal Navy
- RSS Intrepid – a Republic of Singapore shipname
- USS Intrepid – any one of four ships of the United States Navy

== See also ==
- Intrepid (disambiguation)
- Intrepid class, classes of ships named Intrepid
- French ship Intrépide – any one of ten ships of the French Navy
