= French ship Intrépide =

At least 10 ships of the French Navy have borne the name Intrépide ("Intrepid"):

== Ships named Intrépide ==
- Intrépide (1666), a 66-gun ship of the line, was renamed Grand in 1671
- Intrépide (1671), a 48-gun ship of the line
- Intrépide (1690), an 84-gun ship of the line
- Intrépide (1747), a 74-gun Monarque-class ship of the line
- Intrépide (1794), a 24-gun corvette
- Intrépide (1795), a pink, bore the name
- Intrépide (1801), a 74-gun ship of the line acquired from Spain
- Valmy, a 120-gun ship of the line, took the name in 1890 shortly before being broken up
- Intrépide (1864), a 90-gun Algésiras-class steam ship of the line
- Intrépide, an Aventurier-class destroyer ordered by the Argentine Navy but taken over by the French Navy after the start of the First World War. She was launched in 1911 and scrapped in 1938.
Ships of the French Navy named Intrépide
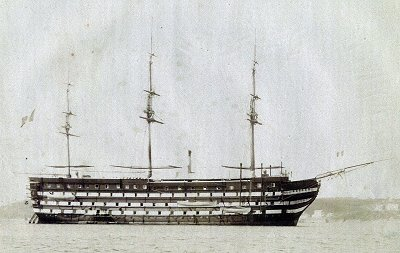
Intrépide (1864) as the school ship Borda

== Other ==
- L'Intrépide, a French military observation balloon of 1795
- L'Intrépide, a Le Hardi-class destroyer. She was launched in 1941 but was never completed and was scrapped after World War II.

== See also ==
- HMS Intrepid
- USS Intrepid
- Intrepid (disambiguation)

== Notes and references ==
=== Bibliography ===
- Roche, Jean-Michel (2005). Dictionnaire des bâtiments de la flotte de guerre française de Colbert à nos jours. Vol. 1. Group Retozel-Maury Millau. p. 258. ISBN 978-2-9525917-0-6. OCLC 165892922.
- Roche, Jean-Michel (2005). Dictionnaire des bâtiments de la flotte de guerre française de Colbert à nos jours. Vol. 2. Group Retozel-Maury Millau. ISBN 978-2-9525917-0-6. OCLC 165892922.
