= Intrepid class =

Intrepid class is a ship class, usually named for a lead ship named Intrepid or a variation of;

- Intrepid-class gunvessel, British Royal Navy mid-19th-century wooden sloops
- Intrepid-class ship of the line, a British Royal Navy mid-18th-century third rate ships of the line
- Intrépida-class fast attack craft of the Argentine Navy dating from the 1970s
- Intrépido-class submarine (Type 206 submarine) of the Colombian Navy, with two active units

== See also ==
- Intrepid (ship), ships named Intrepid, including unique (non-class) ships
- Intrepid (disambiguation)
