= ARA San Juan =

At least four ships of the Argentine Navy have been named ARA San Juan:

- ARA San Juan (1911), an Aventurier-class destroyer launched in 1911 but requisitioned before completion by France in 1914 and renamed Temeraire
- ARA San Juan (1928), a survey vessel commissioned in 1928; she was renamed Comodoro Rivadavia in 1937 and Madryn in 1942; sold in 1967.
- ARA San Juan (D-9), a Buenos Aires-class destroyer launched in 1937 and scrapped in 1973.
- ARA San Juan (S-42), a TR-1700-class submarine launched in 1983 and lost in 2017.

== Sources ==
- Blackman, Raymond V. B., ed. (1953). Jane's Fighting Ships 1953–54. London: Sampson, Low and Marston. OCLC 913556389.
- Chesneau, Roger, ed. (1980). Conway's All the World's Fighting Ships 1922–1946. Greenwich, UK: Conway Maritime Press. ISBN 0-85177-146-7.
