= Intrepid =

Intrepid, Intrepida, Intrepide, Intrepido, or similar, may refer to:

== People and organizations ==
- Intrepid, the code name of William Stephenson, the Canadian World War II spymaster
- The Intrepid Sea-Air-Space Museum in Manhattan
- Intrepid Travel, Australia based small group adventure company
- Intrepid Games, a satellite company of the computer game developer Lionhead Studios, now disbanded
- Intrepid Kart, an Italian kart racing chassis manufacturer
- Intrepid Camera, a British large format camera manufacturer

== Vessels and vehicles ==
- French ship Intrépide, any of several French Navy ships, dating back to 1666
- HMS Intrepid, any of several Royal Navy ships, dating back to 1747
- L'Intrépide, a French military observation balloon of 1795
- USS Intrepid, any of several US Navy and fictional ships, dating back to 1803
- Intrepid (balloon aircraft), an American Civil War military observation balloon
- Italian ship Intrepido, any of several Italian Navy ships, dating back to 1912
- Spanish ship Intrépido
  - Spanish ship Intrépido (1790), a San Ildefonso class warship, a ship-of-the-line of Spain
  - Intrépido (D38), an Audaz-class destroyer of the Spanish Navy from 1962 to 1982.
- Intrepid (yacht), US-22, an America's Cup sailboat that competed in 1967 and 1970
- LM Intrepid, Lunar Module of the 1969 Apollo 12 lunar landing mission
- Intrepid-class gunvessel, British Royal Navy mid-19th-century wooden sloops
- Intrepid-class ship of the line, a British Royal Navy mid-18th-century third rate ships of the line
- Intrépida-class fast attack craft of the Argentine Navy dating from the 1970s
  - ARA Intrépida (P-85), a Intrépida-class fast attack craft
- Intrepid RM-1, a Chevrolet-powered IMSA GTP car, which raced from 1991 to 1993
- Dodge Intrepid, an automobile built by Chrysler from 1993 to 2004
- RSS Intrepid (69), a Formidable-class frigate of the Singapore Navy since 2008.
- ARC Intrépido (ST-20), a submarine of the Colombian Navy; see List of active ships of the Colombian Navy

=== Fictional vehicles ===
- BWS Intrepid, a fictional Union of Border Worlds ship in Wing Commander IV: The Price of Freedom
- Astronave Intrepido, another name for Space Battleship Yamato (fictional spaceship)
- Intrepid-class starship, a Star Trek ship class, the class of USS Voyager featured on Star Trek: Voyager
  - USS Intrepid, a fictional Intrepid-class Star Trek starship featured on Star Trek: Intrepid
- USS Intrepid, a fictional Constitution-class starship from the original Star Trek episode "The Immunity Syndrome" (Star Trek: The Original Series)

== Entertainment ==
- Intrepid (film), a 2000 action film
- L'intrepido, 2013 Italian comedy film
- Star Trek: Intrepid, a series of fan films
- Intrepido, weekly Italian comic magazine
- Intrepid, a 1983 arcade video game by Nova Games Ltd.

== Other ==
- Intrepid Ibex, the codename for the 8.10 (October 2008) release of the Ubuntu Linux operating system
- IBM Intrepid, a supercomputer at Argonne National Laboratory
