= CSS Rappahannock =

- CSS Rappahannock

History

United Kingdom
- Name: Victor
- Ordered: 15 May 1855
- Builder: Money Wigram & Son, Blackwall
- Cost: £45,450
- Laid down: 24 May 1855
- Launched: 2 November 1855
- Commissioned: 1 April 1856
- Fate: Sold to R. Gordon Coleman as Scylla in November 1863 and resold later the same month to the Confederacy

Confederate States
- Name: CSS Rappahannock
- Commissioned: November 1864
- Decommissioned: April 1865
- Fate: Turned over to United States

General characteristics
- Class & type: Intrepid-class gunvessel
- Tons burthen: 868 49/94 bm
- Length: 200 ft (61 m) pp
- Beam: 30 ft 4 in (9.25 m)
- Depth of hold: 14 ft 6 in (4.42 m)
- Installed power: 1,166 ihp (869 kW)
- Propulsion: 2-cylinder horizontal single-expansion steam engine; Single screw
- Sail plan: Barque
- Speed: 11.6 knots (21.5 km/h)
- Complement: 100
- Armament: As built (HMS Victor): 1 × 68-pounder muzzle-loading rifle; 4 × 32-pounder (25cwt) muzzle-loading smoothbore guns; Later: 1 × 7-inch/110-pounder breech loader; 1 × 40-pounder breech loader; 4 × 20 pounder breech loaders

CSS Rappahannock, a steam sloop-of-war, was built at the Blackwall Yard on the River Thames by Money Wigram & Son in 1855 as an Intrepid-class gunvessel for the Royal Navy and named HMS Victor. Although a handsomely modeled vessel, numerous defects occasioned her sale in 1863. An agent of the Confederate States Government purchased her ostensibly for the China trade, but British authorities suspected she was destined to be a Confederate commerce raider and ordered her detention. Nevertheless, she succeeded in escaping from Sheerness, England, on November 24, with workmen still on board and only a token crew. Her Confederate States Navy officers joined in the English Channel.

When he bought her from the Admiralty through his secret agent on November 14, Commander Matthew F. Maury had intended Rappahannock to replace the cruiser CSS Georgia and was about to transfer Georgia's guns to her. She was ideal for a cruiser — wooden-hulled and bark-rigged with two engines and a lifting screw propeller.

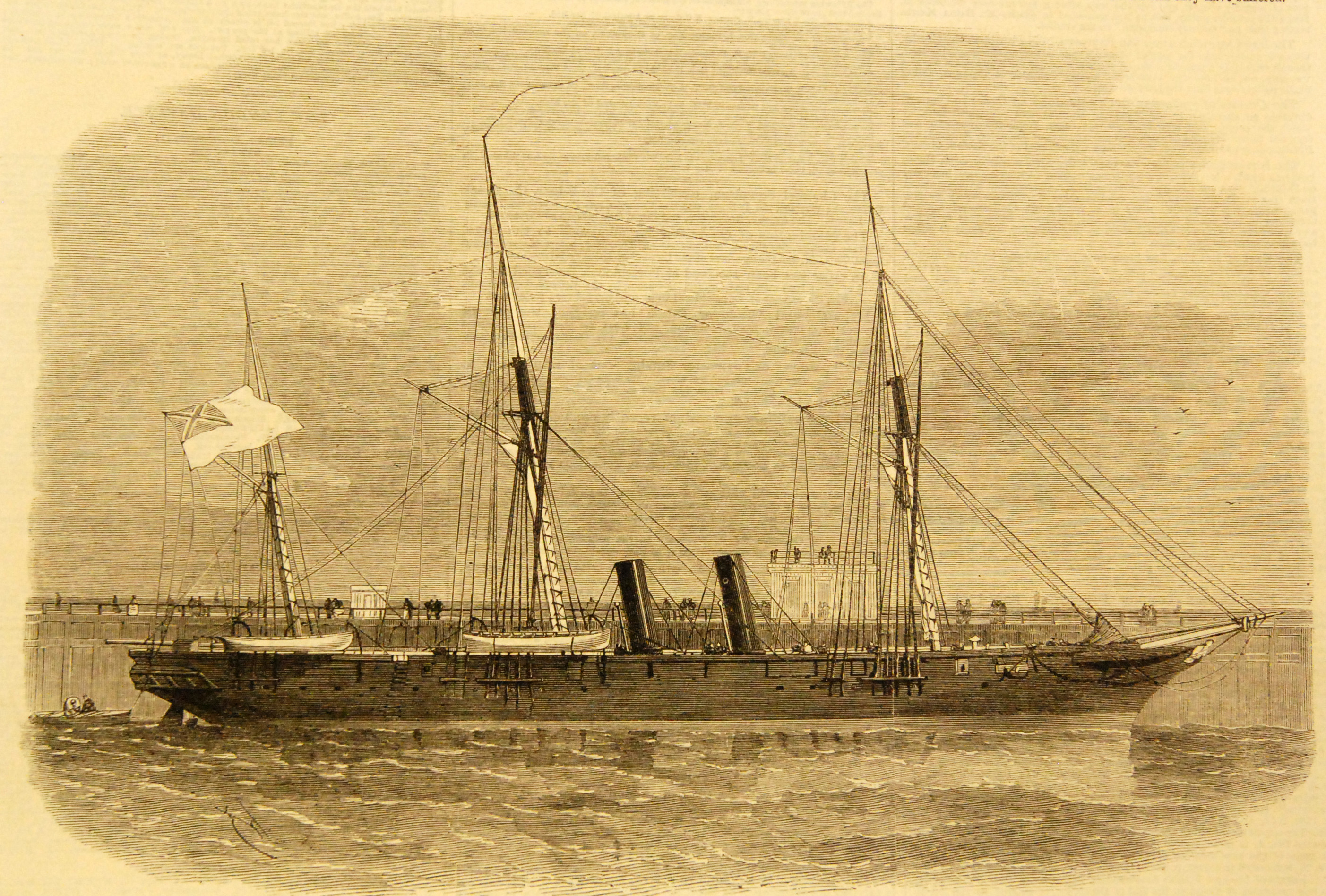
The Confederate Screw-Steamer Rappahannock lying at Calais Pier, 1863

She was commissioned a Confederate man-of-war underway, but while passing out of the Thames Estuary her bearings burned out and she had to be taken across to Calais for repairs. There Lieutenant C. M. Fauntleroy, CSN, was placed in command. Detained on various pretexts by the French Government, Rappahannock never got to sea and was turned over to the United States at the close of the war.
