= List of shipwrecks in January 1826 =

The list of shipwrecks in January 1826 includes some ships sunk, wrecked or otherwise lost during January 1826.

== 1 January ==
List of shipwrecks: 1 January 1826
Ship	State	Description
Carolina Frederica	Stettin	The ship was driven ashore and damaged at Lowestoft, Suffolk, United Kingdom. She was on a voyage from Stettin to London, United Kingdom. Carolina Frederica was later refloated.
Fisher	United Kingdom	The sloop was wrecked near Peterhead, Aberdeenshire. She was on a voyage from Dunbar, Lothian, to Aberdeen.
George	United Kingdom	The smack foundered in Loch Eriboll. Her five crew were rescued by Trader (United Kingdom). She was on a voyage from Ballina, County Mayo, to London.
Haabet	Russia	The ship was wrecked on Mousa, Shetland Islands, United Kingdom, with the loss of all hands. She was on a voyage from Riga to Toulon, Var, France.
Ida Margaretta	Denmark	The ship was wrecked on the Double Headed Shot Key, in the Caribbean Sea. Her thirteen were rescued on 4 January by Elizabeth (United Kingdom). She was on a voyage from Havana, Cuba, to Hamburg.
Margaret & Jean	United Kingdom	The ship was beached at Lisbon, Portugal. She was on a voyage from Seville, Spain to London.
Mary	United Kingdom	The ship sprang a leak and foundered in the Irish Sea off Wicklow Head. Her crew were rescued.
Mary Ann	United Kingdom	The sloop was wrecked on Skokholm, Pembrokeshire. Her crew were rescued. She was on a voyage from Newport, Monmouthshire, to Dublin.

== 2 January ==
List of shipwrecks: 2 January 1826
Ship	State	Description
Centaurus	Spain	The ship was wrecked at Marbella. Her crew were rescued. She was on a voyage from Alicante to Londonderry, United Kingdom
Colombia	United States	The ship was driven ashore at Gibraltar.
Delight	United Kingdom	The ship was driven ashore and severely damaged at Bridlington, East Riding of Yorkshire. She was refloated on 26 January.
Elvira	Sweden	The ship was driven ashore and wrecked at Gibraltar.
Flight	United States	The ship was driven ashore at Gibraltar. She was refloated on 5 January.
James Monroe	United States	The ship was driven ashore at Gibraltar. She was refloated on 6 January with assistance from HMS Thetis (Royal Navy).
Jeune Laure	France	The ship was driven ashore at Gibraltar. She was on a voyage from Marseille, Bouches-du-Rhône to Martinique. Jeune Laure was refloated in mid-January with assistance from HMS Thetis (Royal Navy).
Zes Gebroeders	Netherlands	The ship was abandoned off Texel, North Holland. She was subsequently taken in to the Nieuw Diep.

== 3 January ==
List of shipwrecks: 3 January 1826
Ship	State	Description
Bien Heureux	United Kingdom	The ship was driven ashore and wrecked at Teignmouth, Devon, United Kingdom. Her crew were rescued. She was on a voyage from Dunkirk, Nord to Brest, Finistère.
Delight	United Kingdom	The ship was driven ashore and damaged at Bridlington, Yorkshire. She was on a voyage from Hamburg to Bridlington.
Elizabeth and Ann	United Kingdom	The ship was wrecked at Harwich, Essex. She was on a voyage from Sunderland, County Durham, to London.
Experiment	United Kingdom	The ship was driven ashore and wrecked in Annatto Bay, Jamaica. She was on a voyage from Saint John, New Brunswick, British North America to Jamaica.
Fame, Highlander	United Kingdom	The ships were in collision in the Clyde and were beached. Fame was on a voyage from Greenock, Renfrewshire to Liverpool, Lancashire. She was later refloated and resumed her voyage. The paddle steamer Highlander was on a voyage from Tobermory, Mull to Greenock. She was later refloated and taken in to Greenock in a leaky condition.
Hope	United Kingdom	The ship was driven ashore and wrecked at Orford, Suffolk. Her crew were rescued.
Oscar	Netherlands	The ship was driven ashore at "Bacares". She was on a voyage from Buenos Aires, Argentina to Málaga, Spain and Cette, Hérault, France.
Susannah	United Kingdom	The ship was driven ashore at Carlingford, County Louth. She was on a voyage from London to Dundalk, County Louth. She was later refloated and taken in to Warren Point, County Antrim.
Swiftsure	United Kingdom	The schooner as wrecked on a reef off the Braco Group.

== 4 January ==
List of shipwrecks: 4 January 1826
Ship	State	Description
Antigone	France	The ship was driven ashore in the Garonne at Bordeaux, Gironde. She was on a voyage from Bordeaux to Martinique. Antigone was later refloated.
Barcelona	Spain	The ship was lost near Ocracoke, North Carolina, United States. She was on a voyage from Havana, Cuba to Baltimore, Maryland, United States.
Elizabeth & Jane	United Kingdom	The ship was wrecked at Harwich, Essex. She was on a voyage from London to Sunderland, County Durham.
Schofield	United Kingdom	The ship departed from Bangor for London. No further trace, presumed foundered with the loss of all hands.

== 5 January ==
List of shipwrecks: 5 January 1826
Ship	State	Description
Clarion	United Kingdom	The ship was run down and sunk in the Atlantic Ocean off Cape Cod, Massachusetts, United States. Her crew were rescued.
Hesper	United Kingdom	The ship was wrecked near Narbonne, Aude, France. Her crew were rescued. She was on a voyage from Liverpool, Lancashire, to Marseille, Bouches-du-Rhône, France.
Intrepid	United Kingdom	The ship was driven ashore and wrecked near Skerries, County Dublin. She was on a voyage from Alexandria to Liverpool, Lancashire.
Iris	Sweden	The ship was driven ashore at Perpignan, Pyrénées-Orientales, France.
Perseverance	United Kingdom	The ship foundered in the Irish Sea off Dunmore East, County Waterford. Her crew were rescued. She was on a voyage from Newport, Monmouthshire, to Glasgow, Renfrewshire.
Providence	United Kingdom	The ship was wrecked on the Felskago Reef. Her crew were rescued.

== 6 January ==
List of shipwrecks: 6 January 1826
Ship	State	Description
Aronta	Kingdom of Sardinia	The ship struck the mole and sank at Genoa. She was on a voyage from Senegal to Genoa.
Elizabeth	United Kingdom	The ship sank at Kingstown, County Dublin. She was on a voyage from Cardiff, Glamorgan, to Dundalk, County Louth.
Fame	United Kingdom	The sloop was driven ashore at Dublin. She was on a voyage from Dublin to Drogheda, County Louth.
Letitia	United Kingdom	The ship was driven ashore at Dublin. She was on a voyage from Quebec City, Lower Canada, British North America, to Dublin. Letitia was refloated on 10 January and taken in to Dublin.
Margaret and Mary	United Kingdom	The ship was wrecked near Newry, County Antrim. she was on a voyage from Liverpool, Lancashire, to Newry.
Marian	United Kingdom	The barque was driven ashore and wrecked at Dublin. She was on a voyage from Quebec City to Dublin.
Marie Anne	Netherlands	The ship ran aground on the Goodwin Sands, Kent, United Kingdom and was damaged. She was on a voyage from Antwerp to Bordeaux, Gironde, France. Marie Anne was later refloated and taken in to Ramsgate in a waterlogged condition.
Robinson Potter	United States	The ship was abandoned in the Atlantic Ocean. All on board survived. She was on a voyage from Antwerp, Netherlands to Providence, Rhode Island.
Sampson	United Kingdom	The collier, a brig, was driven ashore at Dublin.

== 7 January ==
List of shipwrecks: 7 January 1826
Ship	State	Description
Agnes	United Kingdom	The brig foundered in the Atlantic Ocean (48°29′N 10°19′W). Her twelve crew were rescued by Frances (United States). She was on a voyage from St. Mary's, Nova Scotia, British North America, to Leith, Lothian.
Catherine	United Kingdom	The ship was wrecked on the Mouse Sand, in the North Sea off the coast of Essex with the loss of three of her crew. Two of the crew of Joseph (United Kingdom), which went to her assistance, were also lost. Catherine was on a voyage from Hull, Yorkshire, to London.
Elizabeth	United Kingdom	The ship was wrecked on the Shot Keys.
Fisher	United Kingdom	The ship was wrecked near Boddam, Aberdeenshire. She was on a voyage from Dunbar, Lothian, to Aberdeen.
Hector	Kingdom of Hanover	The ship was driven ashore near Gravelines, Nord, France. She was on a voyage from Emden to Gibraltar.
Oscar	Sweden	The ship was wrecked at Perpignan, Pyrénées-Orientales, France. Her crew were rescued. She was on a voyage from Buenos Aires, Argentina to Cette, Hérault, France.

== 8 January ==
List of shipwrecks: 8 January 1826
Ship	State	Description
Arabella	United Kingdom	The schooner foundered in the Atlantic Ocean south west of Cape Clear Island, County Cork. Her crew were rescued by Jupiter (United Kingdom).
Cumberland	United States	The ship was run into and sunk at Belfast, County Antrim, United Kingdom, by Mercator (Sweden).

== 9 January ==
List of shipwrecks: 9 January 1826
Ship	State	Description
HMS Algerine	Royal Navy	The 10-gun brig-sloop foundered in the Bay of Egina.
Bien-Heureux	France	The ship was wrecked off the Ness, Teignmouth, Devon
Nymph	United Kingdom	The ship was abandoned in the Atlantic Ocean. Her crew were rescued by Albion (United Kingdom). Nymph was on a voyage from Montreal, Lower Canada, British North America to Liverpool, Lancashire She was boarded by some of the crew of Albion and towed in to Cork.

== 10 January ==
List of shipwrecks: 10 January 1826
Ship	State	Description
Cora	United Kingdom	The ship was driven ashore and wrecked 12 nautical miles (22 km) east of Tangier, Morocco. Her crew were rescued. She was on a voyage from Liverpool, Lancashire, to Naples, Kingdom of the Two Sicilies.

== 11 January ==
List of shipwrecks: 11 January 1826
Ship	State	Description
Crisis	United Kingdom	The ship departed from Cowes, Isle of Wight for New York. No further trace, presumed foundered with the loss of all hands.
Fanny	United Kingdom	The ship struck the Catchops rocks, at the mouth of the Tagus and was abandoned by her crew. She subsequently came ashore and was severely damaged. Fanny was on a voyage from Bristol, Gloucestershire to Dartmouth, Devon and Lisbon, Portugal. She was refloated with assistance from HMS Aurora (Royal Navy) and anchored off the Belém Tower.

== 12 January ==
List of shipwrecks: 12 January 1826
Ship	State	Description
Martha	United Kingdom	The ship departed from British Honduras for the Clyde. No further trace, presumed foundered with the loss of all hands.

== 13 January ==
List of shipwrecks: 13 January 1826
Ship	State	Description
Lavinia	United Kingdom	The ship was abandoned in the Atlantic Ocean. Her crew were rescued by Riseborough (United Kingdom). Lavinia was on a voyage from Gibraltar to Dublin.

== 14 January ==
List of shipwrecks: 14 January 1826
Ship	State	Description
Agnes	United Kingdom	The ship was abandoned in the Atlantic Ocean whilst on a voyage from St. Mary's, Nova Scotia, British North America to Leith, Lothian. She subsequently came ashore on the west coast of South Uist, Outer Hebrides on 9 February.
Bristol	United Kingdom	The ship was wrecked in Ballinscillig Bay. She was on a voyage from Newport, Monmouthshire, to Youghal, County Cork.

== 15 January ==
List of shipwrecks: 15 January 1826
Ship	State	Description
Eliza	United Kingdom	The brig was wrecked on Sandy Cove Island, County Cork, with the loss of a crew member.
Jane	United Kingdom	The ship was run down and sunk by Speke (United Kingdom) in the Atlantic Ocean 400 nautical miles (740 km) west of Penzance, Cornwall. Her crew were rescued. Jane was on a voyage from São Miguel, Azores, Portugal, to London.
Liddell	United Kingdom	The brig was driven ashore and wrecked at "Carabournow", Russia. She was on a voyage from Odesa to Liverpool, Lancashire.
Hope	United Kingdom	The ship was driven ashore and wrecked at "Doumouzden", Ottoman Empire. She was on a voyage from Odesa to Bristol, Gloucestershire.

== 16 January ==
List of shipwrecks: 16 January 1826
Ship	State	Description
Sinclair	(United Kingdom of Great Britain and Ireland) Grenada	The drogher was wrecked in Grenville Bay.
Two unidentified schooners	Unknown	Both on the Seven Stones Reef, Cornwall, one disappeared from view immediately and the second was lost with all hands.

== 17 January ==
List of shipwrecks: 17 January 1826
Ship	State	Description
Delight	United Kingdom	The ship was driven ashore and wrecked on Tiree, Inner Hebrides. Her crew were rescued.
Evander	United Kingdom	The ship was driven ashore and wrecked on Tiree. Her crew were rescued. She was on a voyage from Limerick to Greenock, Renfrewshire.

== 18 January ==
List of shipwrecks: 18 January 1826
Ship	State	Description
Havana Packet	Hamburg	The ship departed from Havana, Cuba for Hamburg. No further trace, presumed foundered with the loss of all hands.

== 19 January ==
List of shipwrecks: 19 January 1826
Ship	State	Description
Amitie	France	The ship departed from Martinique for Dunkirk, Nord. No further trace, presumed foundered with the loss of all hands.
Hendrica	Sweden	The ship was driven ashore near Marstrand. She was on a voyage from London, United Kingdom to Gothenburg. She was later refloated and taken in to "Karingoen" and then Marstrand.

== 20 January ==
List of shipwrecks: 20 January 1826
Ship	State	Description
Ranger	United Kingdom	The ship was driven ashore and damaged at Wells-next-the-Sea, Norfolk. She was refloated on 25 January and taken in to Wells-next-the-Sea.
Sector	United Kingdom	The ship was wrecked at São Miguel Island, Azores. She was on a voyage from London to São Miguel Island.

== 21 January ==
List of shipwrecks: 21 January 1826
Ship	State	Description
City	United Kingdom	The ship departed from Dublin for Glasgow, Renfrewshire. No further trace, presumed foundered in the Irish Sea with the loss of all hands.
Erin	United Kingdom	The ship was driven ashore at "Crio Nero", Greece.

== 23 January ==
List of shipwrecks: 23 January 1826
Ship	State	Description
Jane	United Kingdom	The ship departed from Saint John, New Brunswick, British North America for an English port. No further trace, presumed foundered with the loss of all hands.
Juno	United Kingdom	The ship departed from St. John's, Newfoundland, British North America for an English port. No further trace, presumed foundered in the atlantic Ocean with the loss of all hands.

== 24 January ==
List of shipwrecks: 24 January 1826
Ship	State	Description
Caledonia	United Kingdom	The ship struck a reef or wreck and was consequently beached at Panama City, Gran Colombia.

== 25 January ==
List of shipwrecks: 25 January 1826
Ship	State	Description
Boldon	United Kingdom	The ship was driven ashore on Yorkshire. She was later refloated.
Collingwood	United Kingdom	The ship was driven ashore and severely damaged on Flamborough Head, Flamborough Head. She was on a voyage from London to Sunderland, County Durham. Collingwood was refloated on 9 February and taken in to Scarborough, Yorkshire.
Europe	United Kingdom	The ship was driven ashore at Scarborough, Yorkshire. She was refloated the next day and taken in to Scarborough.
Margaret	United Kingdom	The ship was driven ashore near Flamborough Head.

== 27 January ==
List of shipwrecks: 27 January 1826
Ship	State	Description
Albion	United Kingdom	The ship ran aground and sank in the Bristol Channel. She was on a voyage from Cardiff, Glamorgan to Liverpool, Lancashire.
Sally	United Kingdom	The ship was wrecked on the Bahama Banks. She was on a voyage from Cádiz, Spain to Havana, Cuba.

== 29 January ==
List of shipwrecks: 29 January 1826
Ship	State	Description
John and Ann	United Kingdom	The ship was wrecked at New Grimsby, Scilly Isles with the loss of all on board. She was on a voyage from Cádiz, Spain, to Hull, Yorkshire.
Minerva	France	The ship was driven ashore at the mouth of the River Tees. She was on a voyage from Newcastle upon Tyne, Northumberland to Gravelines, Nord.

== 30 January ==
List of shipwrecks: 30 January 1826
Ship	State	Description
Molly	United Kingdom	The ship foundered off the Isle of Glass Lighthouse. She was on a voyage from County Clare to Glasgow, Renfrewshire.

== 31 January ==
List of shipwrecks: 31 January 1826
Ship	State	Description
Omnium	United Kingdom	The ship ran aground off Anholt, Denmark. She was on a voyage from Copenhagen, Denmark to Hull, Yorkshire. Omnium later floated off and came ashore at "Warburg".
Zealous	United Kingdom	The ship struck rocks at Aberdeen and sank.

== Unknown date ==
List of shipwrecks: Unknown date in January 1826
Ship	State	Description
Anna	United Kingdom	The ship was lost whilst on a voyage from the Nicobar Islands to Rangoon, Burma. At least two of her crew survived.
Aris	United Kingdom	The ship foundered in the North Sea off the coast of Friesland, Netherlands.
Bellisarius	Flag unknown	The ship foundered in the Atlantic Ocean off the coast of Nova Scotia, British North America before 9 January.
Blossom	United Kingdom	The ship foundered in the Irish Sea off Wexford. She was on a voyage from Plymouth, Devon, to Liverpool, Lancashire.
Ceres	United Kingdom	The ship was driven ashore near Cape Wrath, Caithness. She was on a voyage from Trondheim, Norway to Dundalk, County Louth. Ceres was later refloated and repaired.
Eliza and Jane	United Kingdom	The ship was wrecked on the West Rocks, Harwich, Essex before 7 January. Her crew were rescued.
Espoir	France	The ship was lost at Saint-Louis, Senegal before 3 January.
Ida Margaretta	Hamburg	The ship was wrecked on the Double Headed Shot Keys before 4 January. Her crew were rescued. She was on a voyage from Havana, Cuba to Hamburg.
Neptune	Spain	The ship was wrecked whilst on a voyage from Málaga to Matanzas, Mexico. Her crew survived.
New Friendship	United Kingdom	The ship struck a reef and sank off Greenore Point, County Louth.
Prince Coburg	United Kingdom	The ship was driven ashore and damaged in the Orkney Islands. She was on a voyage from Kirkwall, Orkney Islands to Sligo. Prince Coburg was later refloated and taken in to Stromness.
Providence	United Kingdom	The ship was wrecked near Præstø, Denmark, in early January. Her crew were rescued. She was on a voyage from Saint Petersburg, Russia, to Hull, Yorkshire.
Sisters	United Kingdom	The ship was driven ashore at Trapani, Sicily before 3 January. She was on a voyage from Trapani to Dublin. Sisters was refloated on 7 January and taken in to Trapani.
