= HMS Pioneer (1856) =

Gunvessel of the Royal Navy

History

United Kingdom
- Name: HMS Pioneer
- Ordered: 18 April 1855
- Builder: Pembroke Dockyard
- Laid down: July 1855
- Launched: 19 January 1856
- Commissioned: 31 May 1856
- Decommissioned: October 1864
- Fate: Sold for breaking up at Plymouth in 1865

General characteristics
- Class & type: Intrepid-class gunvessel
- Tons burthen: 868 49/94 bm
- Length: 200 ft (61 m) pp
- Beam: 30 ft 4 in (9.25 m)
- Depth of hold: 14 ft 6 in (4.42 m)
- Installed power: 1,150 ihp (860 kW)
- Propulsion: 2-cylinder horizontal single-expansion steam engine; Single screw
- Sail plan: Barque
- Speed: 11.3 knots (20.9 km/h)
- Complement: 100
- Armament: As built: 1 × 68-pounder muzzle-loading rifle; 4 × 32-pounder (25cwt) muzzle-loading smoothbore guns; Later: 1 × 7-inch/110-pounder breech loader; 1 × 40-pounder breech loader; 4 × 20 pounder breech loaders

HMS Pioneer was a 4-gun Intrepid-class gunvessel launched on 19 January 1856 from the Pembroke Dockyard. She saw active service in China and was decommissioned in 1864.

== Service history ==
She was commissioned to the North America and West Indies Station before serving as part of the Channel Squadron. She was then assigned to the East Indies Station and China Station where she participated in the Taiping Rebellion. She was then assigned to the Australia Station in 1862 serving until 1863.

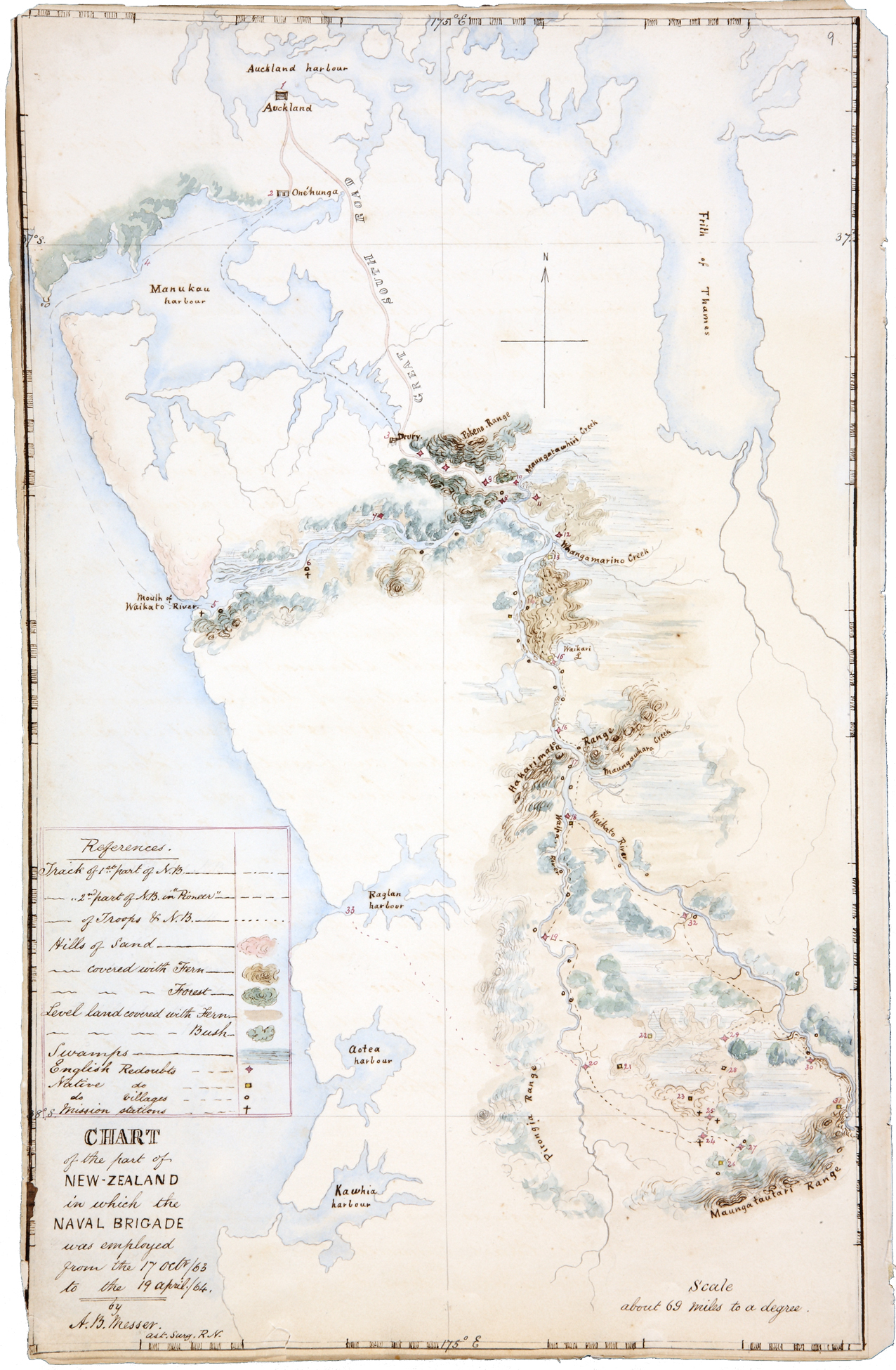
Map showing her part in the Invasion of the Waikato in New Zealand

== Fate ==
Upon returning to Plymouth, she was sold to Marshall in October 1864 for breaking in 1865.

== Named in her honour ==
The Queensland Governor, George Bowen, named the Pioneer River in Queensland, Australia after the ship in which he visited the river in 1862.
