= French destroyer Opiniâtre =

Destroyer of the French Navy

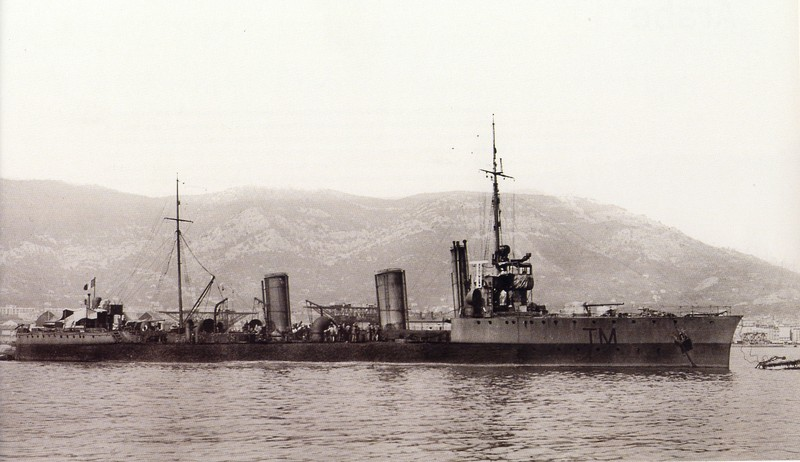
- Sister ship Téméraire at anchor

History

France
- Name: Opiniâtre
- Builder: Dyle et Bacalan, Bordeaux
- Launched: January 1911
- In service: 16 September 1914
- Stricken: 1933
- Fate: Scrapped, 1935

General characteristics
- Class & type: Aventurier-class destroyer
- Displacement: 930 t (915 long tons) (normal); 1,250 t (1,230 long tons) (deep load)
- Length: 88.5 m (290 ft 4 in) (o/a)
- Beam: 8.6 m (28 ft 3 in)
- Draft: 3.1 m (10 ft 2 in)
- Installed power: 5 Foster-Wheeler boilers; 18,000 shp (13,000 kW)
- Propulsion: 2 shafts; 2 steam turbines
- Speed: 32 knots (59 km/h; 37 mph)
- Range: 1,850 nmi (3,430 km; 2,130 mi) at 10 knots (19 km/h; 12 mph)
- Complement: 140
- Armament: 4 × single 100 mm (3.9 in) guns; 1 × single 47 mm (1.9 in) AA gun; 4 × single 450 mm (18 in) torpedo tubes

The French destroyer Opiniâtre was one of four Aventurier-class destroyers that was built for the Argentine Navy in the early 1910s. The ships were taken over by the French Navy after the start of the First World War in August 1914. She was scrapped in 1935.

== Design and description ==
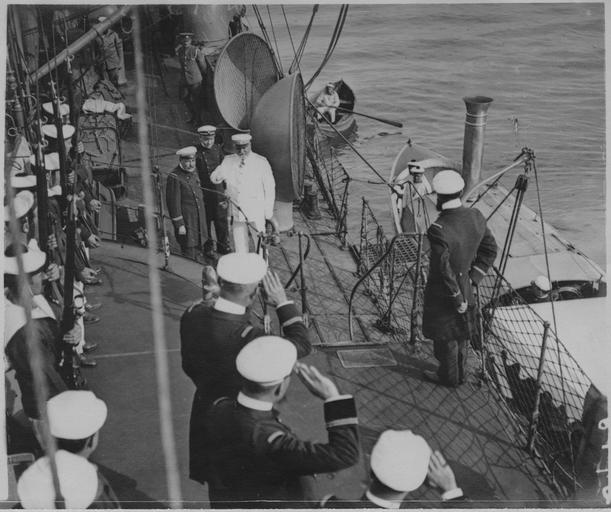
Vice-admiral de Gueydon boarding Opiniâtre, 15 May 1916

The ships had an overall length of 88.5 meters (290 ft 4 in), a beam of 8.6 meters (28 ft 3 in), and a draft of 3.1 meters (10 ft 2 in). They displaced 930 metric tons (915 long tons) at normal load and 1,250 t (1,230 long tons) at deep load. Their crew numbered 140 men.

The ships were powered by a pair of Rateau steam turbines, each driving one propeller shaft using steam provided by five mixed-firing Foster-Wheeler boilers. The engines were designed to produce 18,000 shaft horsepower (13,000 kW) which was intended to give the ships a speed of 32 knots (59 km/h; 37 mph). The ships carried 230 t (226 long tons) of coal and 72 t (71 long tons) of fuel oil that gave them a range of 1,850 nautical miles (3,430 km; 2,130 mi) at a cruising speed of 10 knots (19 km/h; 12 mph).

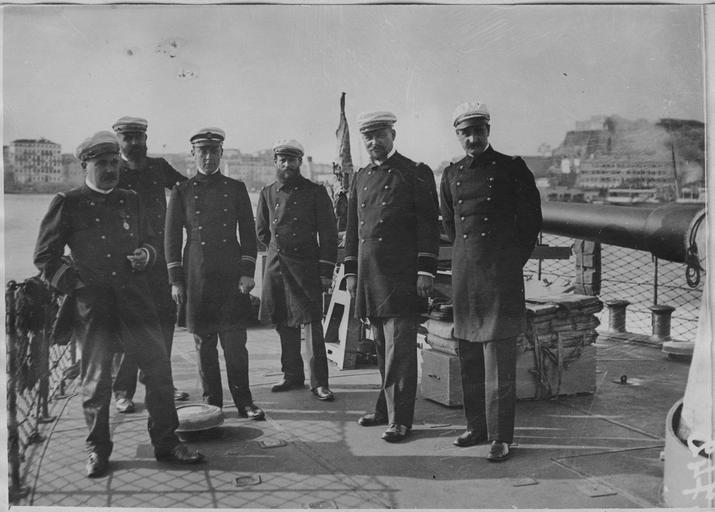
Officers of Opiniâtre in May 1915, next to the barrel of one of the destroyer's guns

The primary armament of the Aventurier-class ships consisted of four 100-millimeter (3.9 in) guns in single mounts, one on the forecastle, one between the funnels, and two on the quarterdeck, in front and behind the searchlight platform. They were fitted with a 47-millimeter (1.9 in) AA gun for anti-aircraft defence. The ships were also equipped with four single mounts for 450-millimeter (17.7 in) torpedo tubes amidships.

== Construction and career ==
Opinâtre was ordered from Dyle et Bacalan and was launched in 1911 with the name of La Rioja at its Bordeaux shipyard. The ship was completed on 16 September 1914.

On 27 May 1915, Opiniâtre and her sister ship Téméraire escorted the armored cruiser Victor Hugo as she transported Vice-Admiral (Vice-amiral) Augustin Boué de Lapeyrère, commander of the 1st Naval Army (1^{ère} Armée Navale), to Taranto, Italy, for a meeting with Admiral Prince Luigi Amedeo, Duke of the Abruzzi (Duca degli Abruzzi), Commander-in-Chief of the Royal Italian Navy (Regia Marina).

She was struck in 1933 and broken up for scrap in 1935.
