= French ship Intrépide (1690) =

Ship of the line of the French Navy

History

France
- Name: Intrépide
- Builder: Rochefort Dockyard
- Laid down: April 1689
- Launched: March 1690
- Commissioned: May 1690
- Fate: Condemned in June 1717 and broken up at Toulon in 1724

General characteristics
- Tonnage: 1,500
- Length: 151 French feet (Note: The French (pre-metric) foot was 6.575% longer than the equivalent English foot.)
- Beam: 42 French feet 10 inches
- Draught: 20½ French feet
- Depth of hold: 18 French feet 4 inches
- Complement: 550 men (400 in peacetime), + 9 officers
- Armament: 82 later 84 guns

Intrépide was a First Rank three-decker ship of the line of the French Royal Navy. She was intended to be armed with 68 guns as a Second Rank ship including a partially armed upper deck but was modified during construction and completed as a First Rank with 82 guns, comprising twenty-eight 36-pounder guns on the lower deck, twenty-six 18-pounder guns on the middle deck, and twenty-four 8-pounder guns on the upper deck (two more were added from 1706), with four 4-pounder guns on the quarterdeck.

Designed and constructed by Honoré Malet, she was begun at Rochefort Dockyard in April 1689 and launched in March of the following year. She was completed in May 1690 and took part in the Battle of Beachy Head on 10 July 1690. She later took part in the Battle of Lagos on 28 June 1693 and in the Battle of Velez Malaga on 24 August 1704. In July 1707 she was one of the ships scuttled at Toulon on Louis XIV's orders during the siege of that port, but was subsequently refloated and refitted. She was condemned in June 1717 at Toulon and used as a hulk, before being taken to pieces in 1724.
