= Intrepid (1829 ship) =

UK merchant ship 1829–1834

History

United Kingdom
- Name: Intrepid
- Builder: Thomas Brodrick, Whitby
- Launched: 1829
- Fate: Wrecked 29 October 1834

General characteristics
- Tons burthen: 401, or 402 (bm)
- Complement: 16 (1832)

Intrepid was a ship launched at Whitby in 1829. She traded with Quebec in 1830, later carrying migrants to Canada. She was lost at Colombo in 1834.

== Career ==
Intrepid first appeared in Lloyd's Register (LR) in 1830. In 1830 Intrepid was registered in Hull.

Year	Master	Owner	Trade	Source
1830	Robinson	Beadle & Co.	Hull	LR

At the time a number of ships were sailing from Whitby with immigrants to Canada. Crown sailed in 1828; Intrepid, Addison, Gulnare, Earl Stanhope, and Jackson sailed in 1830. However, on Intrepid's first voyage to Canada she sailed in ballast, i.e., without cargo or passengers. She sailed from Whitby on 12 June 1830, and arrived at Quebec City on 8 August. She cleared outward bound on 14 September.

On 21 January 1831, Thomas Robinson pleaded guilty to the charge of having a fire aboard his vessel. He was fined £3.

In 1831, Intrepid sailed to Archangel. She returned with a cargo of wheat, oats, and mats. She also brought lumber, masts, spars, and oars, and ten tongues.

Intrepid sailed from Hull on 25 March 1832, with passengers, possibly including labourers. She arrived at Quebec City on 5 May. She had not stopped, as she was supposed to, at the quarantine station at Grosse Isle. She was therefore ordered back to the quarantine ground as an example, to prevent others violating the law in the same manner. She arrived back in Hull around 21 July, with timber and wheat.

Intrepid again sailed from Hull on 16 August 1832. She arrived at Quebec City on 4 October, with 19 settlers.

Year	Master	Owner	Trade	Source
1833	Robinson	Beadle & Co.	Hull–Quebec; Liverpool–Bombay	Register of Shipping

In 1833, Intrepid sailed for India, sailing via Rio de Janeiro. On 11 October, she was at Bengal (Calcutta). While Intrepid was in Calcutta, Robinson's eldest son, the 15-year old Thomas Jr., died there.

On 20 June 1834, Intrepid sailed from Gravesend, bound for Ceylon.

== Fate ==
A gale drove Intrepid ashore on 29 November 1834, at Colombo, wrecking her. Her crew were rescued. She was outward bound for London.
