= Intrepid-class gunvessel =

Class of wooden gunvessels

- Victor in her later guise as CSS Rappahannock in c.1864

Class overview
- Name: Intrepid-class gunvessel
- Builders: Pembroke Dockyard; Money Wigram & Sons, Blackwall; J. Scott Russell, Millwall
- Operators: Royal Navy; Confederate States Navy
- Preceded by: Vigilant class
- Succeeded by: Philomel class
- Built: 1855-1856
- In commission: 1855-1865
- Planned: 8
- Completed: 6
- Scrapped: 5

General characteristics
- Type: Wooden gunvessel
- Displacement: 1,042 tons
- Tons burthen: 868 49/94 bm
- Length: 200 ft (61 m) pp
- Beam: 30 ft 4 in (9.25 m)
- Draught: 12 ft 6 in (3.81 m) (deep)
- Depth of hold: 14 ft 6 in (4.42 m)
- Installed power: 350 nominal horsepower
- Propulsion: 2-cylinder horizontal single-expansion steam engine; Single screw
- Sail plan: Barque
- Speed: About 11.5 knots (21.3 km/h)
- Complement: 100
- Armament: As built: 1 × 68-pounder muzzle-loading rifle; 4 × 32-pounder (25cwt) muzzle-loading smoothbore guns; Later: 1 × 7-inch/110-pounder breech loader; 1 × 40-pounder breech loader; 4 × 20 pounder breech loaders

Intrepid-class gunvessels were a class of six Royal Navy first-class wooden gunvessels built in 1855-56. They were rated as sloops from 1859 to 1862, (Note: Except Victor, which remained a gunvessel throughout the period) and were scrapped by 1865. Victor was sold to the Confederate States of America as the raider CSS Rappahannock, but she was interned by the French at Calais and never fulfilled her intended function.

== Design and construction ==
Designed in 1855, the Intrepid-class gunvessels were intended to serve in the shallow waters of the Black and Baltic seas during the Crimean War. They were built quickly, and of inferior wood, which explains their short lifespan of 10 years.

=== Propulsion ===
A two-cylinder horizontal single-expansion steam engine produced between 930 indicated horsepower (690 kW) and 1,302 ihp (971 kW) through a single screw, giving a speed of about 10.5 knots (19.4 km/h). Twin funnels distinguished them from most other British classes of gunvessel.

=== Sail plan ===
The vessels of the class were designed to be barque-rigged, which required less manpower than the traditional full-rigged ship.

=== Armament ===
The Intrepid-class gunvessels were designed with one 68-pounder muzzle-loading rifle and four 32-pounder (25cwt) muzzle-loading smoothbore guns. This armament was later replaced with a single 7-inch/110-pounder breech loader, one 40-pounder breech loader and four 20 pounder breech loaders.

== Ships ==
The first pair were ordered on 18 April 1855, the second pair were ordered on 15 May 1855, and the final pair were ordered on 27 July 1855. A further two were ordered on 9 April 1856 from Pembroke Dockyard, but were cancelled.

| Name | Ship Builder | Launched | Fate |
|---|---|---|---|
| Flying Fish | Pembroke Dockyard | 20 December 1855 | Broken up by Castle, Charlton, arriving in August 1866 |
| Pioneer | Pembroke Dockyard | 19 January 1856 | Sold to Marshall in October 1864 for breaking at Plymouth in 1865 |
| Victor | Money Wigram & Sons | 2 November 1855 | Sold as Scylla to Gordon Coleman & Company in November 1863, who resold her later the same month to the Confederacy as the raider CSS Rappahannock. She was interned by the French at Cherbourg and never served the Confederacy at sea |
| Intrepid | Money Wigram & Sons | 13 November 1855 | Sold to Marshall on 7 October 1864 for breaking at Plymouth in 1865 |
| Roebuck | J Scott Russell | 22 March 1856 | Sold to Castle, Charlton for breaking in 1864 |
| Nimrod | J Scott Russell | 21 April 1856 | Sold to White, Cowes for breaking on 2 June 1865 |
