= Italian ship Intrepido =

Intrepido was the name of at least four ships of the Italian Navy and may refer to:

- Italian destroyer Intrepido (1912), an Indomito-class destroyer launched in 1912 and sunk in 1915.
- Italian destroyer Audace (1916), an Urakaze-class destroyer ordered by Japan from a British builder as Kawakaze. She was sold to Italy in 1916 before launching and renamed first Intrepido and then Audace. Launched in 1917, seized by Germany in 1943 and renamed TA20. Sunk in 1944.
- Italian torpedo boat Intrepido, a Ciclone-class torpedo boat launched in 1943. Seized by Germany and renamed TA25 in September 1943. She was sunk in 1944.
- Italian destroyer Intrepido (D 571), an Impavido-class destroyer launched in 1962 and decommissioned in 1991.
