= HMS Intrepid (1855) =

Gunvessel of the Royal Navy

History

United Kingdom
- Name: HMS Intrepid
- Builder: Wigram, fitted with engines at the East India Docks
- Launched: 13 November 1855
- Fate: Sold, 1864

General characteristics
- Class & type: Intrepid-class gunvessel
- Tons burthen: 862 bm
- Armament: 6 guns

HMS Intrepid was a Victorian era British Royal Navy sloop of war and the lead ship of six Intrepid-class gunvessels. She was a member of Blue Squadron in the 23 April 1856 Fleet Review of ships which had taken part in Vice-Admiral Sir Charles Napier's Baltic Sea campaign against Russia during the Crimean War. On 17 November 1859, Intrepid ran ashore near Mytilene, Greece. She was part of the Mediterranean Fleet in 1860.
