= HMS Intrepid =

Eight ships of the Royal Navy have been named HMS Intrepid:

- HMS Intrepid (1747) was a 64-gun third rate, previously the French ship Sérieux. She was captured in 1747 and broken up by 1765.
- HMS Intrepid (1770) was a 64-gun third rate launched in 1770, used for harbour service from 1810 and sold in 1828.
- HMS Intrepid (1780) was a 16-gun sloop launched in 1780. She foundered in 1800.
- HMS Intrepid (1850) was a wood-hulled screw discovery sloop, previously the civilian Free Trade, launched in 1847 by R & H Green at Blackwall. The Navy purchased her on 28 February 1850 and briefly named her HMS Perseverance; she became HMS Intrepid in March 1850. She was abandoned, icebound, in the Arctic on 15 June 1854.
- HMS Intrepid (1855) was a wooden screw gunvessel launched in 1855 and sold in 1864.
- HMS Intrepid (1891) was an Apollo-class protected cruiser launched in 1891. She was converted to a minelayer in 1910 and was sunk as a blockship in the Zeebrugge raid in 1918.
- HMS Intrepid (D10) was an I-class destroyer launched in 1936 and sunk by air attack in 1943.
- HMS Intrepid (L11) was a Fearless-class landing platform dock launched in 1964. She was laid up in 1991 and used for spare parts before being sent for scrapping in 2008.

== Battle honours ==
The ships named HMS Intrepid have amassed a sizeable number of battle honours.

- Minorca 1756
- Lagos 1759
- Quiberon 1759
- Havana 1762
- Martinique 1780
- Chesapeake 1781
- St Kitts 1782
- Toulon 1793
- Martinique 1809
- Zeebrugge 1918
- Atlantic 1939–41
- Dunkirk 1940
- Norway 1940
- Bismarck 1941
- Arctic 1941–43
- Malta Convoys 1942
- Sicily 1943
- Salerno 1943
- Aegean 1943
- Falkland Islands 1982
