= Intrepid (1809 ship) =

History

United Kingdom
- Owner: Jn. Wright (1809)
- Builder: 1809, or 1810 (Note: One source has Intrepid being built by Temple shipbuilders in 1803. There is no support for the 1803 launch year in Lloyd's Register or the Register of Shipping.)
- Launched: Newcastle upon Tyne
- Fate: Wrecked 5 January 1826

General characteristics
- Tons burthen: 367, or 374, or 375 (bm)
- Length: 101 ft (31 m)
- Beam: 29 ft (9 m)
- Armament: 2 × 6-pounder guns + 8 × 18-pouunder carronades

Intrepid was launched in Newcastle upon Tyne in 1809. She then became a transport. In 1820 she made a voyage to Bengal, sailing under a license from the British East India Company (EIC). She then reverted to being a transport. She was wrecked on 5 January 1826.

== Career ==
Intrepid was registered in Whitby in June 1809. She first appeared in Lloyd's Register (LR) in 1811.

Year	Master	Owner	Trade	Source & notes
1811	Postgate	[R.M.] Atty & Co.	London transport	LR; damages repaired 1810
1816	Postgate; Johnson	[R.M.] Atty & Co.	London transport	LR

On 25 October 1816 Intrepid put into Sheerness. She had been on her way from Woolwich to Barbados with troops when a colliery brig had run into her, carrying away Intrepid's bowsprit and jib-boom.

Intrepid was sold to London in 1817.

Year	Master	Owner	Trade	Source & notes
1818	J.Johnson	Atty & Co.	London transport	LR
1819	J.Johnson	Atty & Co.	London–Bengal	LR

In 1813 the EIC had lost its monopoly on the trade between India and Britain. British ships were then free to sail to India or the Indian Ocean under a license from the EIC.

Intrepid sailed for Bengal on 20 January 1820 under a license from the EIC.

Year	Master	Owner	Trade	Source & notes
1821	J.Johnson; R.Elder	Atty	London–Bengal; London transport	LR
1822	J.Elter; Hammet	Atty	London transport	LR
1824	Hammett; Metcalf	Atty	Plymouth transport	LR
1825	R.Metcalf	Burrell & Co.	Plymouth–America	LR

== Fate ==
On 5 January 1826 Intrepid, Metcalf, master, was driven on shore near Skerries, County Dublin. The violence of the gale resulted in her going to pieces on 6 January. She had been on a voyage from Alexandria to Liverpool.
