= Aventurier-class destroyer =

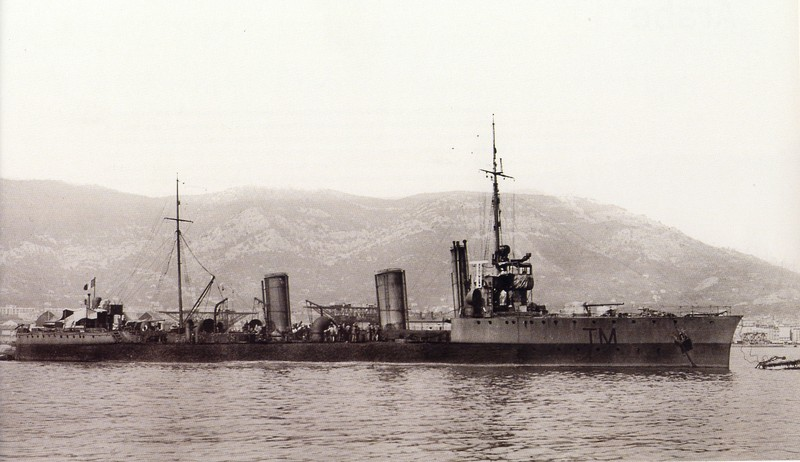
- Téméraire at anchor

Class overview
- Name: Aventurier class
- Operators: French Navy
- Preceded by: Enseigne Roux class
- Succeeded by: Arabe class
- Built: 1911–1914
- In service: 1914–1938
- In commission: 1914–1938
- Completed: 4
- Scrapped: 4

General characteristics
- Type: Destroyer
- Displacement: 930 t (915 long tons) (normal); 1,250 t (1,230 long tons) (deep load)
- Length: 88.5 m (290 ft 4 in) (o/a)
- Beam: 8.6 m (28 ft 3 in)
- Draft: 3.1 m (10 ft 2 in)
- Installed power: 5 Foster-Wheeler boilers; 18,000 shp (13,000 kW)
- Propulsion: 2 shafts; 2 steam turbines
- Speed: 32 knots (59 km/h; 37 mph)
- Range: 1,850 nmi (3,430 km; 2,130 mi) at 10 knots (19 km/h; 12 mph)
- Complement: 140
- Armament: 4 × single 100 mm (3.9 in) guns; 1 × single 47 mm (1.9 in) AA gun; 4 × single 450 mm (18 in) torpedo tubes

The Aventurier-class destroyers were a group of four destroyers built during the early 1910s. Originally ordered by Argentina, they were taken over by the French Navy when the First World War began in August 1914, completed with French armament and renamed.

== Design and description ==
The Aventurier-class ships were significantly larger and more heavily armed than other French destroyers of the period. The ships had an overall length of 88.5 meters (290 ft 4 in), a beam of 8.6 meters (28 ft 3 in), and a draft of 3.1 meters (10 ft 2 in). They displaced 930 metric tons (915 long tons) at normal load and 1,250 t (1,230 long tons) at deep load. Their crew numbered 140 men.

The ships were powered by a pair of Rateau steam turbines, each driving one propeller shaft using steam provided by five mixed-firing Foster-Wheeler boilers. The engines were designed to produce 18,000 shaft horsepower (13,000 kW) which was intended to give the ships a speed of 32 knots (59 km/h; 37 mph). The ships carried 230 t (226 long tons) of coal and 72 t (71 long tons) of fuel oil that gave them a range of 1,850 nautical miles (3,430 km; 2,130 mi) at a cruising speed of 10 knots (19 km/h; 12 mph).

The primary armament of the Aventurier-class ships consisted of four 100-millimeter (3.9 in) guns in single mounts, one on the forecastle, one between the funnels, and two on the quarterdeck, in front and behind the searchlight platform. They were fitted with a 47-millimeter (1.9 in) AA gun for anti-aircraft defence. The ships were also equipped with four single mounts for 450-millimeter (17.7 in) torpedo tubes amidships.

== Ships ==
Name	Formerly	Builder	Launched	Fate
Opiniâtre	La Rioja	Dyle et Bacalan, Bordeaux	January 1911	Broken up, 1935
Aventurier	Mendoza	Dyle et Bacalan, Bordeaux	18 February 1911	Broken up, 1940
Téméraire	San Juan	Nantes	8 December 1911	Struck, 1936
Intrépide	Salta	Nantes	25 September 1911	Broken up, 1938
