= RBL 40-pounder Armstrong gun =

RBL 40-pounder gun
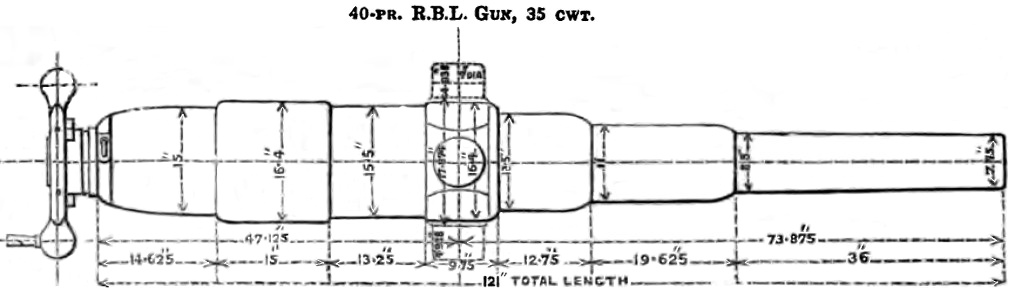
- Diagram from Treatise on the Construction and Manufacture of Ordnance in the British Service (HMSO), 1877
- Type: Naval gun Fortification gun
- Place of origin: United Kingdom

Service history
- In service: 1860s – 1900?
- Used by: United Kingdom; Australian colonies
- Wars: New Zealand Wars; Bombardment of Kagoshima

Production history
- Designer: W.G. Armstrong Co.
- Manufacturer: W.G. Armstrong Co. Royal Gun Factory
- Produced: 1859 – 1863
- No. built: 1013
- Variants: 32cwt, 35cwt

Specifications
- Mass: 32 cwt (3,584 pounds (1,626 kg)), later 35 cwt (3,920 pounds (1,780 kg)) gun & breech
- Barrel length: 106.3 inches (2.700 m) bore & chamber
- Shell: 40 pounds 2 ounces (18.20 kg)
- Calibre: 4.75-inch (120.6 mm)
- Breech: Armstrong screw with vertical sliding vent-piece (block)
- Muzzle velocity: 1,180 feet per second (360 m/s)

The Armstrong RBL 40-pounder gun was introduced into use in 1860 for service on both land and sea. It used William Armstrong's new and innovative rifled breechloading mechanism. It remained in use until 1902 when replaced by more modern Breech Loading (BL) guns.

== Design history ==
The Armstrong screw breech had already proved successful in the RBL 12 pounder 8 cwt field gun, and the British Government requested it be implemented for heavier guns despite Armstrong's protests that the mechanism was unsuited to heavy guns. Guns were produced at both the Royal Gun Factory in Woolwich, and the Elswick Ordnance Company.

Like other early Armstrong guns they were rifled on a polygroove system, firing a variety of lead coated projectiles.

== Variants ==
The first version weighed 32 cwt, followed by the 35 cwt version which introduced a longer and stronger breech-piece. A 32 cwt variant having a horizontal sliding-wedge breech instead of the Armstrong screw with vertical vent-piece was introduced in 1864 as an attempt to address the perceived weaknesses of the screw-breech design. It was withdrawn from service by 1877.

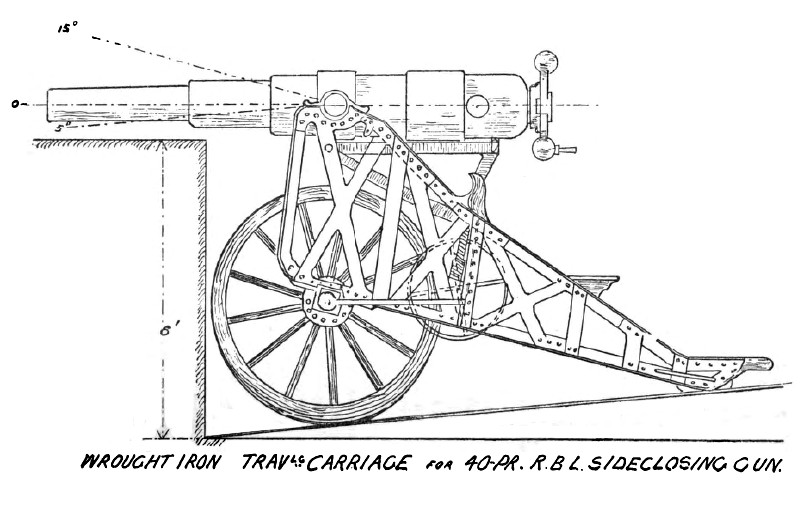
Diagram depicting side-closing version on siege travelling carriage in position to fire over parapet

From 1880 a small number of 35 cwt guns had their trunnion rings rotated to the left to allow the vent-piece to open horizontally to the right, being known as "side-closing" guns. They differed from the wedge guns in that the vent piece was still locked in place by tightening the screw behind it.

== Naval service ==
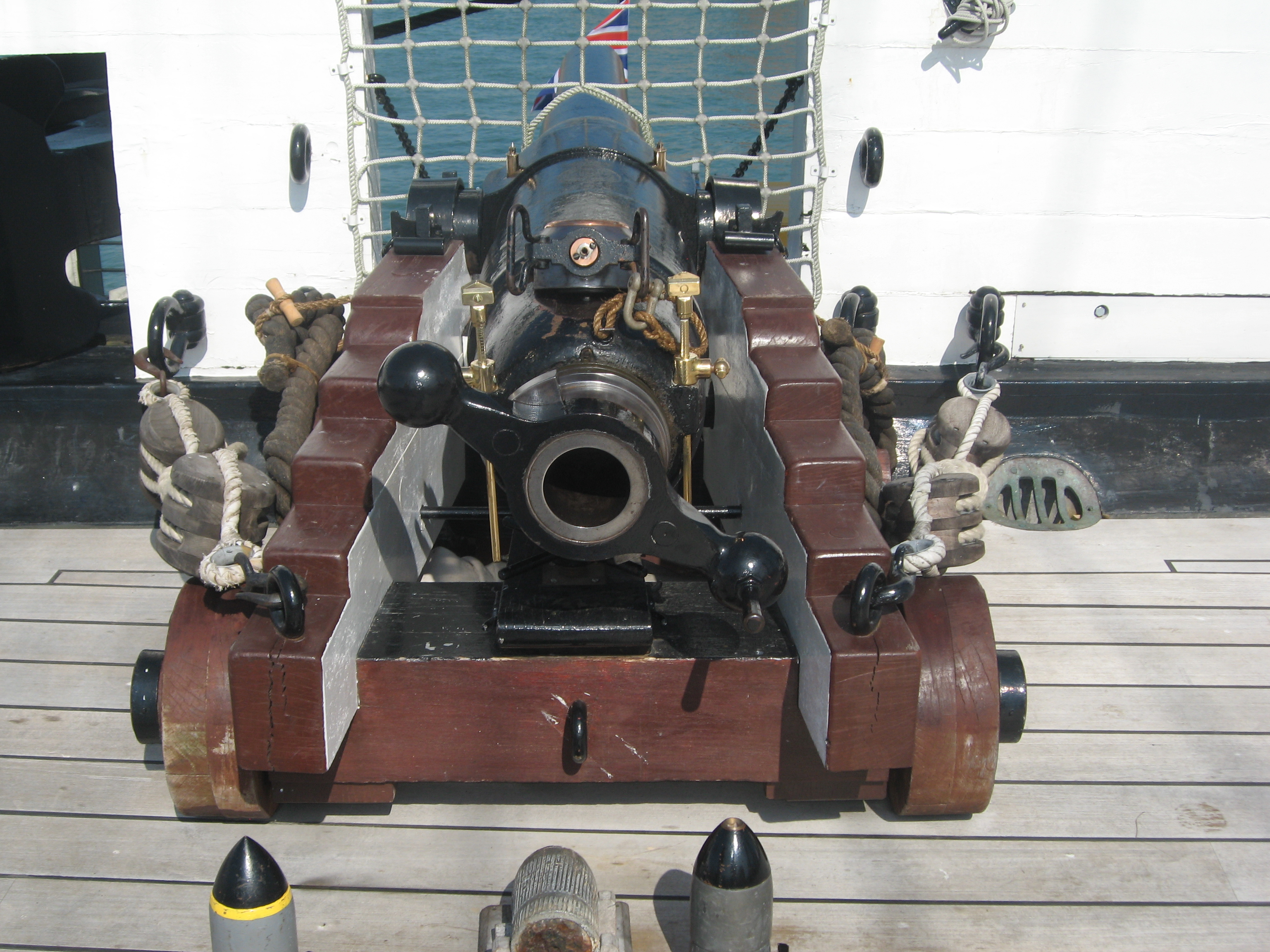
35 cwt broadside gun on HMS Warrior

The gun was recommended in 1859 for the Navy as a broadside or pivot gun.

An officer from HMS Euryalus described the gun's performance at the Bombardment of Kagoshima of August 1863:

The 40-pounder we found answer exceedingly well, for coming out of the place [Kagoshima] we planted common shell, with pillar fuze, wherever we wished, at a range of 3,800 yards. Three steel vent-pieces broke, but another placed them immediately and no harm was done. These guns work very easily, are very true, and the drill is very simple.

— Reported in The Times, 25 April 1864.

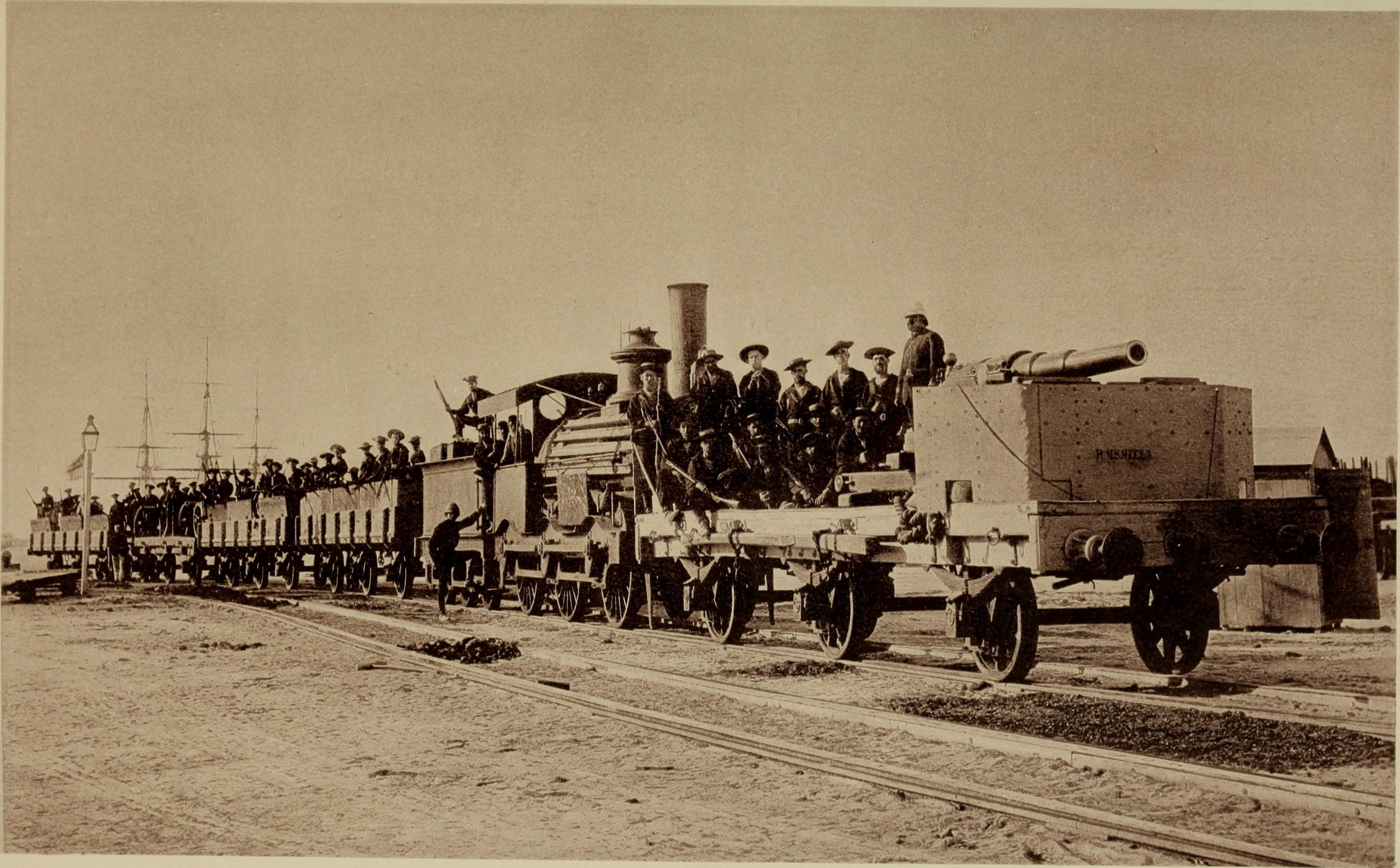
40 Pounder mounted on an armed train, for naval and military operations in Egypt, 1882

Following the bombardment of Alexandria in 1882, as part of the Anglo-Egyptian War, an armed train was employed. One 40 Pounder RBL was mounted onto the train and manned by men of the Royal Navy. It saw some action at the battle of Kassasin on 1 September 1882.

== Land service ==
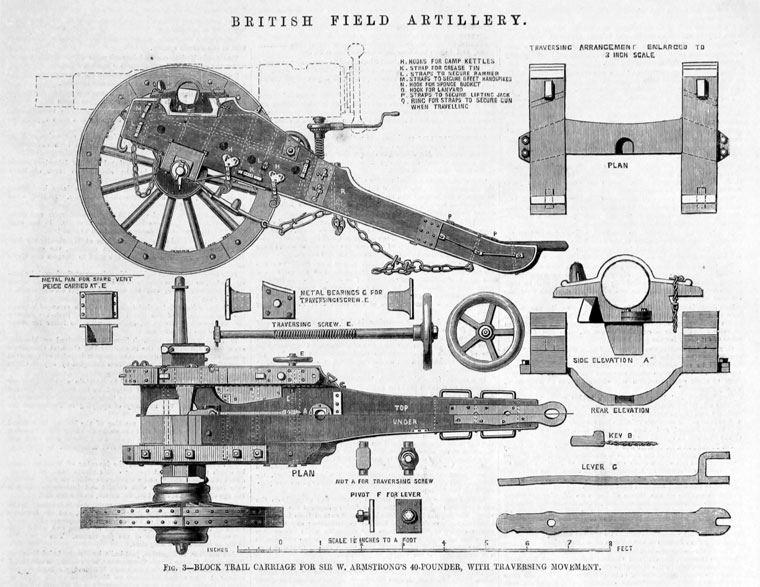
RBL 40-pounder Armstrong gun block trail carriage diagrams

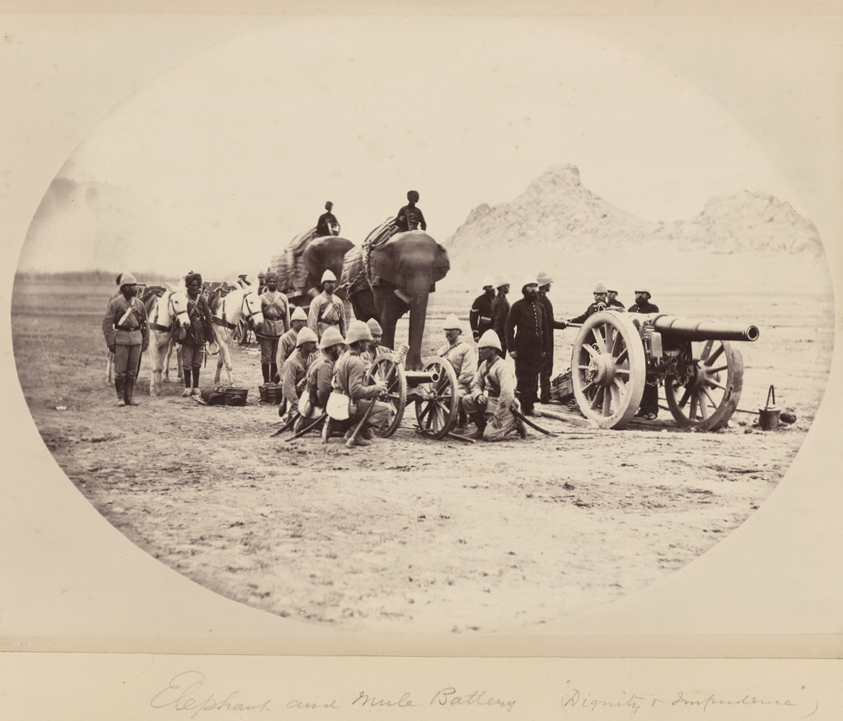
Titled "Dignity & Impudence" for stereotypic personality traits of elephants and mules respectively, this photograph by John Burke shows an elephant and mule battery during the Second Anglo-Afghan War. The mule team would have hauled supplies or towed the small field gun, while the elephants towed the larger gun. The gun appears to be a rifled muzzle loader (RML) 7-pounder mountain gun. The men in the photograph are a mix of British soldiers and Indian sepoys. The group kneeling around the smaller, muzzle-loaded field gun is preparing to fire after the soldier at front left has used the ramrod to jam the charge down into the gun. The gun at right, towed by elephants, appears to be a rifled breech loader (RBL) 40-pounder Armstrong.

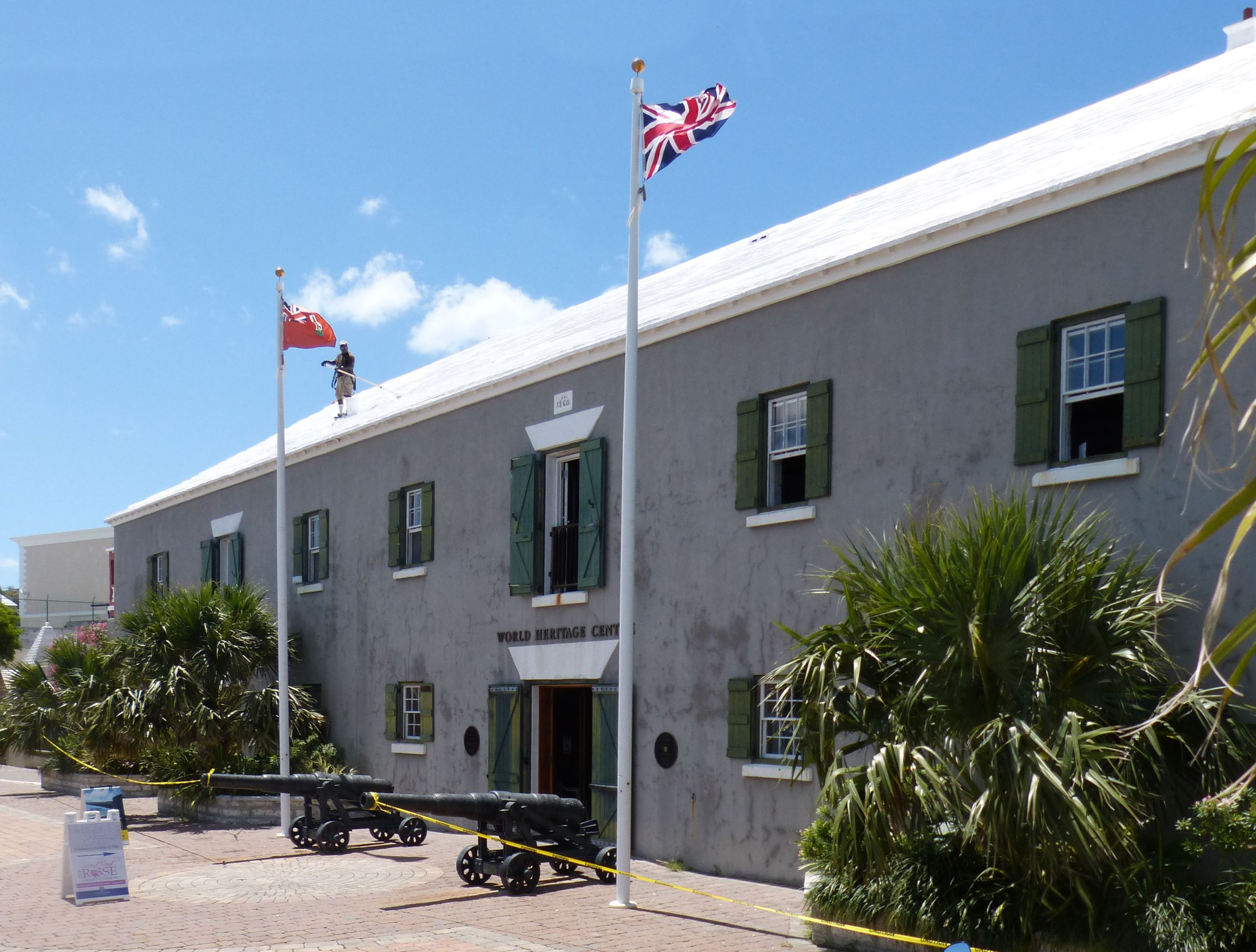
Two of the five examples known to survive in Bermuda, on display at the UNESCO World Heritage Centre, St. George's

A number of different carriages for guns employed for Land Service were available. A wooden siege carriage with wheels and attached limbers, enabled the guns to be drawn by teams of heavy horses.

For guns mounted in fortifications they could be mounted on two different types of carriage. The first was an iron traversing carriage, enabling the gun to be traversed right and left, with recoil being absorbed with a carriage being mounted on a slide. Others were mounted on high "siege travelling carriages" for use as semi-mobile guns in forts, firing over parapets.

Many were re-issued to Volunteer Artillery Batteries of Position from 1889, with 40 Pounders among 226 guns issued to the Volunteer Artillery during 1888 and 1889. The 1893 the War Office Mobilisation Scheme shows the allocation of thirty Artillery Volunteer position batteries equipped with 40 Pounder guns which would be concentrated in Surrey and Essex in the event of mobilisation. They remained in use in this role until 1902 when they were gradually replaced by 4.7-inch Quick Firing (QF) guns. A number were used for some years afterwards as saluting guns.

=== Indian subcontinent ===
An RBL 40-pounder Armstrong breechloader appears to be present in a photograph by John Burke (photographer) from the Second Anglo-Afghan War (November 1878 – September 1880). The war began when Great Britain, fearful of what it saw as growing Russian influence in Afghanistan, invaded the country from British India. The first phase of the war ended in May 1879 with the Treaty of Gandamak, which permitted the Afghans to maintain internal sovereignty but forced them to cede control over their foreign policy to the British. Fighting resumed in September 1879, after an anti-British uprising in Kabul, and finally concluded in September 1880 with the decisive Battle of Kandahar.

=== Colony of Victoria service ===
The Australian colony of Victoria received six 35 cwt guns in August 1865. They were used as mobile coast fortification guns with one gun being fitted to the colonial sloop Victoria during 1866 & 1867. Later four of the guns were used as field guns at Hastings. Three of these guns are known to survive.

=== Colony of Tasmania service ===
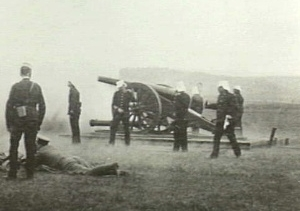
40 pounder RBL, Launceston Volunteer Artillery, Tasmania 1902

As a result of the Jervois-Scratchley reports of 1877 into the defence of Australian colonies following the withdrawal of British troops, the Launceston Volunteer Artillery Corps in Tasmania acquired two guns on late-model iron carriages with iron wheels, which they continued to operate until at least 1902.

== Surviving examples ==
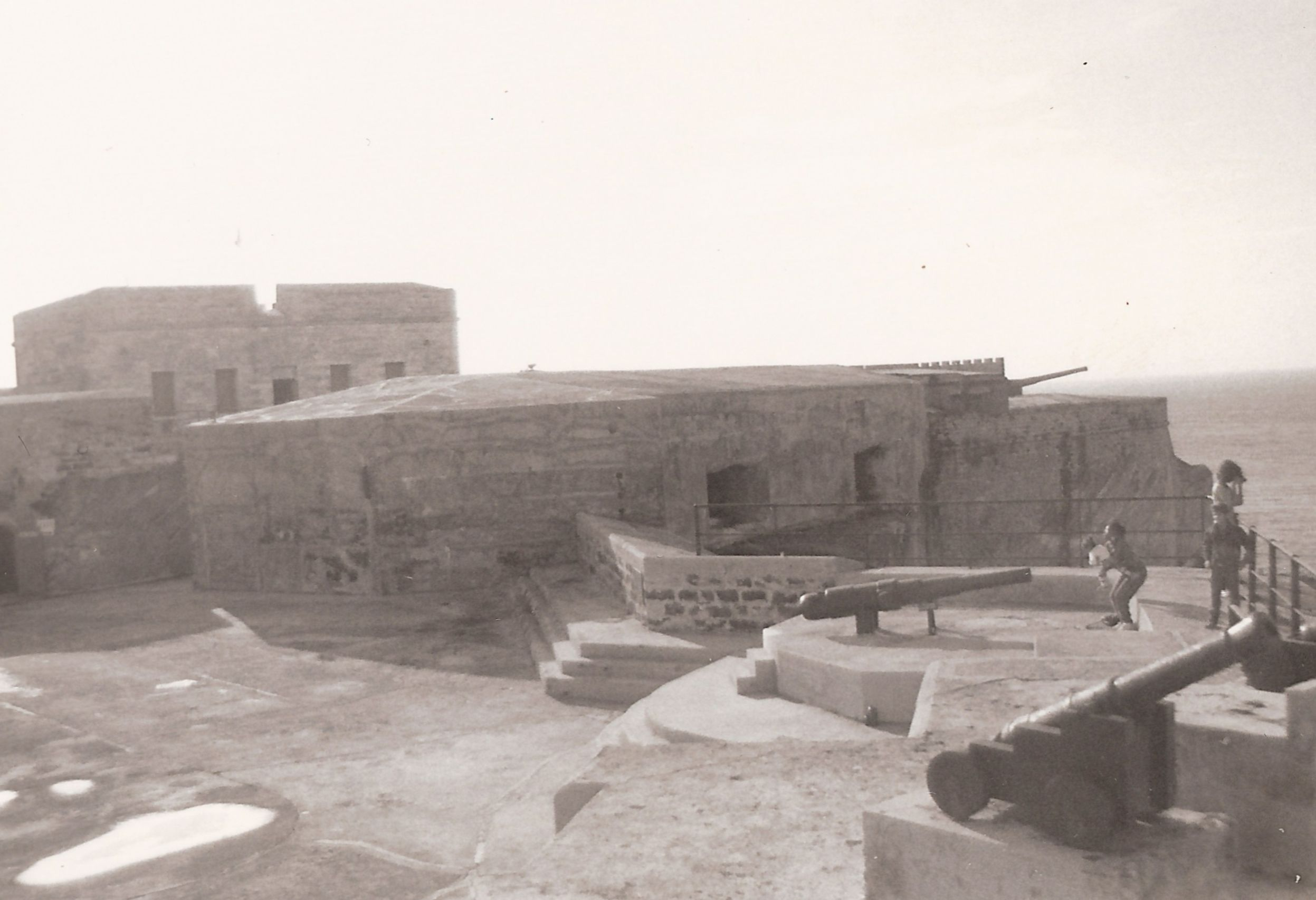
RBL 40-pounder Armstrong gun (in mid ground, without mount) at Fort St. Catherine's, Bermuda

- A gun made by Royal Gun Factory in 1865 at Elizabeth Castle, Jersey
- Three guns recovered as bollards at Broughty Castle, Dundee, Scotland
- Restored gun No. 272 at Hastings-Western Port Historical Society Museum, Victoria, Australia
- Restored Gun No. 271 at Fort Queenscliff, Victoria, Australia
- Unrestored Gun No. 268 in Como Park, South Yarra, Victoria
- A gun at Fort Henry, Canada
- Preserved gun No. 419 G dated 1867 at Canadian War Museum, Ottawa, Canada
- Royal Canadian Artillery Museum, Manitoba, Canada
- A 40-pounder side closing gun made by Elswick Ordnance Company at Royal Armouries, Fort Nelson, Portsmouth
- Fort St. Catherine's, Bermuda. One of eight (of which five are known to survive) sent to the Imperial fortress colony for use as mobile guns to be kept in storage and deployed as required, via the military road (now the South Shore Road) constructed in the 1860s and 1870s, to the various old fortified batteries on the South Shore that had been stripped of their fixed coastal artillery. Replaced by more modern weapons, some or all of these had been relegated to a saluting battery at Fort Victoria before the First World War, remaining there as late as the 1930s.
- Royal Naval Dockyard, Bermuda (two). Another of the eight sent to Bermuda was recovered, with its original mobile carriage, from Bailey's Bay Battery and has been restored and displayed in the Bermuda's Defence Heritage Exhibit (since it opened in 2002) of the Bermuda Maritime Museum (now National Museum of Bermuda) in the cellar of the Commissioner's House, atop the Keep of the fortified North Yard of the dockyard. A third (Mark I serial, number 280 G, manufactured by the Royal Gun Factory in 1864) was set into the wharf as a bollard at Red Barracks, near St. George's Town, on 26 June, 1936. The property is now a private home and guest house, and the owners donated the gun to the museum, which has recovered it and moved it to the Keep.
- Penno's Wharf, St. George's Town, Bermuda. Two were set into the wharf (with the warehouse on the wharf, historically used by the military ordnance) as bollards. These were recovered and restored, and are currently on iron mounts outside the door of the warehouse which now houses the World Heritage Centre created by the St. George's Foundation after the town, along with those fortresses at the East End of Bermuda, were designated in 2000 by the United Nations Educational, Scientific and Cultural Organization's (UNESCO) World Heritage Committee as a World Heritage Site, the Historic Town of St George and Related Fortifications, Bermuda.
- On board HMS Warrior, Portsmouth, UK

== See also ==
- List of naval guns
- Armstrong gun

== Bibliography ==
- Treatise on the Construction and Construction of Ordnance in the British Service. 1877
- Text Book of Gunnery, 1887. LONDON : PRINTED FOR HIS MAJESTY'S STATIONERY OFFICE, BY HARRISON AND SONS, ST. MARTIN'S LANE
- Text Book of Gunnery, 1902. LONDON : PRINTED FOR HIS MAJESTY'S STATIONERY OFFICE, BY HARRISON AND SONS, ST. MARTIN'S LANE
- Alexander Lyman Holley, "A treatise on Ordnance and Armor" published by D Van Nostrand, New York, 1865
- Jones, Colin (1999). "'Disarmed and Disappointed'? The Experience of the Armstrong Breech-loading Guns, 1863–1864". Mariner's Mirror. 85 (2): 205–212. doi:10.1080/00253359.1999.10656742. ISSN 0025-3359.
