= French destroyer Fantassin =

Destroyer of the French Navy

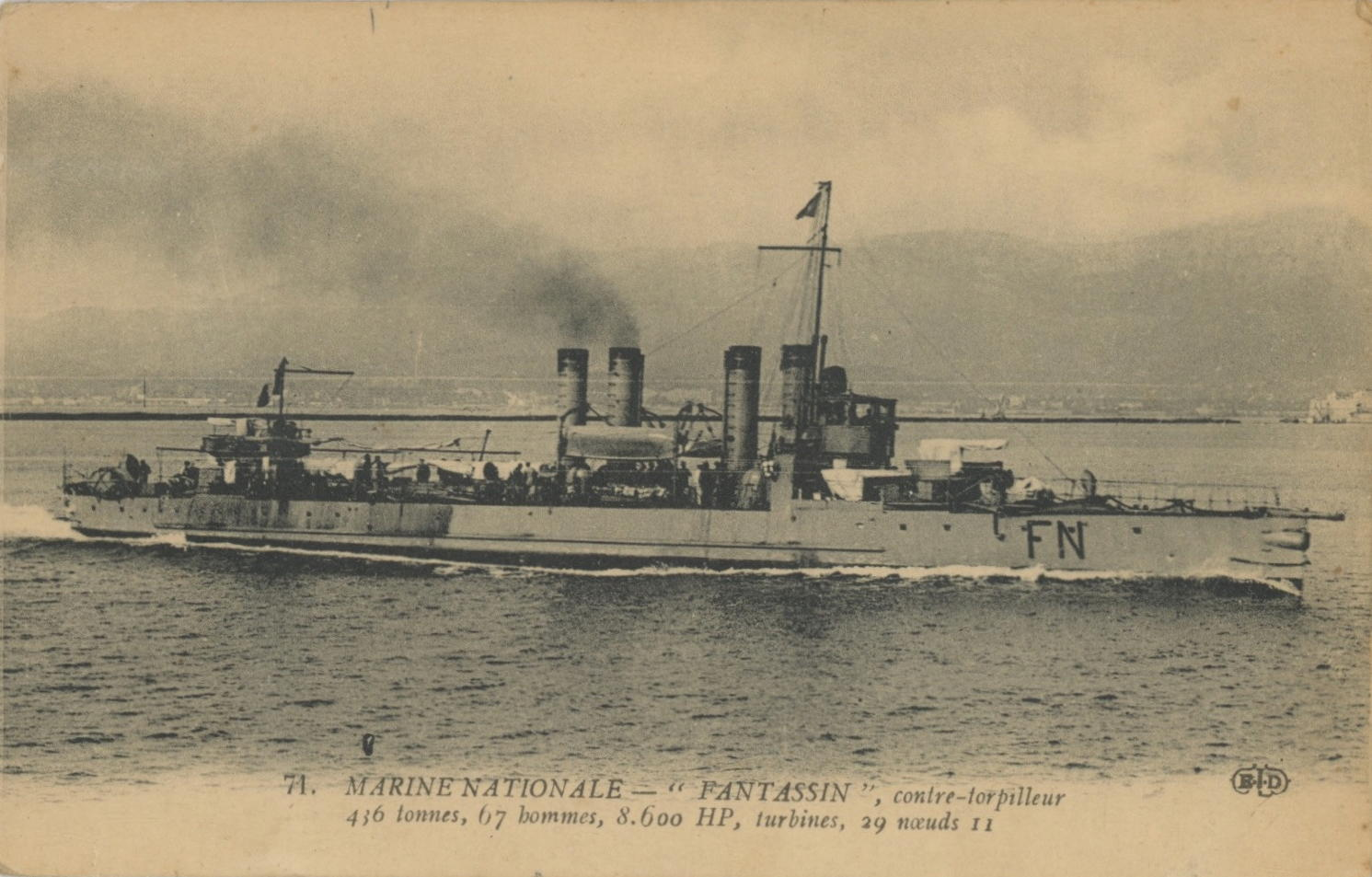
- A postcard of Fantassin

History

France
- Name: Fantassin
- Namesake: Infantryman
- Ordered: 30 October 1907
- Builder: Forges et Chantiers de la Méditerranée, Le Havre-Graville
- Laid down: 1907
- Launched: 17 June 1909
- Completed: June 1911
- Fate: Wrecked in a collision and then scuttled, 5 June 1915

General characteristics
- Class & type: Chasseur-class destroyer
- Displacement: 494 t (486 long tons) (normal)
- Length: 68.95 m (226 ft 3 in) (o/a)
- Beam: 6.875 m (22 ft 6.7 in)
- Draft: 2.545 m (8 ft 4.2 in) (mean)
- Installed power: 4 Normand boilers; 8,600 shp (6,413 kW)
- Propulsion: 3 shafts; 4 steam turbines
- Speed: 28 knots (52 km/h; 32 mph)
- Range: 1,520 nmi (2,820 km; 1,750 mi) at 10 knots (19 km/h; 12 mph)
- Complement: 3 officers, 65 enlisted men
- Armament: 6 × single 65 mm (2.6 in) guns; 3 × 450 mm (17.7 in) torpedo tubes

Fantassin was one of four Chasseur-class destroyers built for the French Navy in the first decade of the 20th century. During World War I, she had to be scuttled by another French ship after being badly damaged during a collision in 1915.

== Design and description ==
The Chasseur class was based on the preceding Spahi-class destroyer, albeit with an all-steam turbine propulsion system rather than the mixed reciprocating and turbine system of the earlier ships. Fantassin had an overall length of 68.95 meters (226 ft 3 in), a beam of 6.55 meters (21 ft 6 in), and a draft of 3.1 meters (10 ft 2 in). Designed to displaced 460 metric tons (453 long tons) at normal load, the ship displaced 560 t (551 long tons) at deep load. Her crew numbered 3 officers and 65 enlisted men.

The Chasseur class was powered by three Parsons direct-drive steam turbines, each driving one propeller shaft using steam provided by four Normand boilers. The engines were designed to produce 8,600 shaft horsepower (6,400 kW) which was intended to give the ships a speed of 28 knots (52 km/h; 32 mph). Fantassin handily exceeded that speed during her sea trials, slightly exceeding 30 knots (56 km/h; 35 mph). Fantassin carried enough fuel oil to give her a range of 1,520 nautical miles (2,820 km; 1,750 mi) at a cruising speed of 10 knots (19 km/h; 12 mph).

The primary armament of the Chasseur-class ships consisted of six 65-millimeter (2.6 in) Modèle 1902 guns in single mounts, one each fore and aft of the superstructure on the centerline and the others were positioned nearby. They were also fitted with three 450-millimeter (17.7 in) torpedo tubes. One of these was in a fixed mount in the bow and the other two were on single rotating mounts between the rear pair of funnels and the aft guns.

== Construction and career ==
Fantassin was ordered from Forges et Chantiers de la Méditerranée on 30 October 1907 and was laid down later that year at its shipyard in Le Havre-Graville. She was launched on 17 June 1909, began her sea trials in April 1910 and was completed in June 1911. The ship initially assigned to the 1st Destroyer Flotilla (1^{ère} escadrille de torpilleurs) of the 1st Fleet (1^{ère} escadre) in the Mediterranean Sea on 9 September 1910, but this was changed to the 2nd Destroyer Flotilla on 18 November while still working up. Together with her three sister ships, Chasseur, Cavalier, and Janissaire, she was scheduled to participate in a large naval review by the President of France, Armand Fallières, off Toulon on 2 September 1911 after the annual fleet maneuvers. Fantassin was transferred to the 3rd Destroyer Flotilla of the 1st Naval Army (1^{ère} Armée navale) on 14 March 1913.

When the First World War began in August 1914, Vice-Admiral (Vice-amiral) Augustin Boué de Lapeyrère, commander of the 1st Naval Army, was tasked to prevent the Austro-Hungarian Navy from leaving the Adriatic Sea and breaking their blockade of Antivari (now known as Bar). His first step was to lead a sweep of the southern Adriatic and clear the approaches to Antivari. During the preliminary stages of the Battle of Antivari on 16 August, the 1st, 4th and 5th Destroyer Flotillas were tasked to escort the core of the 1st Naval Army while the 2nd, 3rd and 6th Flotillas escorted the armored cruisers of the 2nd Light Squadron (2^{e} escadre légère) and two British cruisers. After reuniting both groups and spotting the Austro-Hungarian protected cruiser SMS Zenta and the destroyer SMS Ulan, the French destroyers played no role in sinking the cruiser, although the 4th Flotilla was sent on an unsuccessful pursuit of Ulan. The following day, Fantassin collided with her sister ship Cavalier.

Having broken the Austro-Hungarian blockade of Antivari, Boué de Lapeyrère decided to ferry troops and supplies to the port, escorted by the 2nd Light Squadron and the 1st and 6th Destroyer Flotillas while the rest of the 1st Naval Army bombarded the Austro-Hungarian naval base at Cattaro, Montenegro, on 1 September. Four days later, the fleet covered the evacuation of Danilo, Crown Prince of Montenegro to the Greek island of Corfu. The fleet escorted multiple small convoys loaded with supplies and equipment to Antivari, beginning in October and lasting for the rest of the year, always covered by the larger ships of the Naval Army in futile attempts to lure the Austro-Hungarian fleet into battle.

The torpedoing of the French battleship Jean Bart on 21 December forced a change in French tactics as the battleships were too important to risk to submarine attack. Henceforth, only the destroyers would escort the transports. On 26 March 1915, the badly damaged predreadnought battleship Gaulois radioed for help as she was taking on water in a storm off the Greek coast. Fantassin, her sister ship Cavalier, the destroyer Bouclier and the armored cruiser Jules Ferry responded, but were unable to render assistance due to the heavy weather.

After Italy signed the Treaty of London and declared war on the Austro-Hungarian Empire on 23 May 1915, Boué de Lapeyrère reorganized his forces in late June to cover the approaches to the Adriatic and interdict merchant shipping of the Central Powers since the Royal Italian Navy (Regia Marina) now had primary responsibility for the Adriatic itself. His area of responsibility extended from Sardinia to Crete and he divided it into two zones with the 1st Light Squadron assigned to the western zone and the 2nd Light Squadron in the east. Those destroyers of the 1st Naval Army not assigned to reinforce the Italians were transferred to the newly-formed 1st and 2nd Flotillas of the Naval Army (flotille d'Armée navale). The 1st and 3rd Destroyer Flotillas were assigned to the 2nd Flotilla of the Naval Army, which was tasked to support the cruisers of the 2nd Light Division.

Fantassin was badly damaged when the French destroyer Mameluck accidentally rammed her in the Ionian Sea at 02:30 on 5 June 1916 while the two ships were patrolling the Otranto Barrage 14 nmi (26 km; 16 mi) west of the Greek island of Othonoi. The nearby destroyers and naval trawlers went to the assistance of the two ships and were able to take off Fantassin's entire crew without loss. The destroyer broke in half and sank at 09:00 while under tow.

== Bibliography ==
- Couhat, Jean Labayle (1974). French Warships of World War I. London: Ian Allan. ISBN 0-7110-0445-5.
- Freivogel, Zvonimir (2019). The Great War in the Adriatic Sea 1914–1918. Zagreb: Despot Infinitus. ISBN 978-953-8218-40-8.
- Jordan, John & Caresse, Philippe (2019). French Armoured Cruisers 1887–1932. Barnsley, UK: Seaforth Publishing. ISBN 978-1-5267-4118-9.
- Jordan, John & Caresse, Philippe (2017). French Battleships of World War One. Annapolis, Maryland: Naval Institute Press. ISBN 978-1-59114-639-1.
- Marquis, André Amédée Abel (1921). Conduite de la guerre anti sous-marine en Méditérannée jusqu'à l'organisation de la direction générale des routes [Conduct of anti-submarine warfare in the Mediterranean until the organization of the general direction of convoys] (in French). Paris: École supérieure de Marine.
- Prévoteaux, Gérard (2017). La marine française dans la Grande guerre: les combattants oubliés: Tome I 1914–1915 [The French Navy during the Great War: The Forgotten Combatants, Book I 1914–1915]. Collection Navires & Histoire des Marines du Mond. Vol. 23. Le Vigen, France: Éditions Lela presse. ISBN 978-2-37468-000-2.
- Roberts, Stephen S. (2021). French Warships in the Age of Steam 1859–1914: Design, Construction, Careers and Fates. Barnsley, UK: Seaforth Publishing. ISBN 978-1-5267-4533-0.
- Roche, Jean-Michel (2005). Dictionnaire des bâtiments de la flotte de guerre française de Colbert à nos jours [Dictionary of French Warships from Colbert to the Present Day]. Vol. II: 1870–2006. Group Retozel-Maury Millau. ISBN 978-2-9525917-0-6. OCLC 165892922.* Smigielski, Adam (1985). "France". In Gray, Randal (ed.). Conway's All the World's Fighting Ships 1906–1921. Annapolis, Maryland: Naval Institute Press. pp. 190–220. ISBN 0-87021-907-3.
- Stanglini, Ruggero & Cosentino, Michelle (2022). The French Fleet: Ships, Strategy and Operations, 1870-1918. Barnsley: Seaforth Publishing. ISBN 978-1-5267-0131-2.
