= French ship Bouclier =

At least two ships of the French Navy have been named Bouclier:

- French destroyer Bouclier, a Bouclier-class destroyer launched in 1911 and stricken in 1933
- French torpedo boat Bouclier, a La Melpomène-class torpedo boat commissioned in 1938, seized by the United Kingdom in 1940 and served briefly in the Royal Netherlands Navy before being passed to the FNFL in 1941. She was scrapped in 1950
