= Chasseur-class destroyer =

Class of French naval vessel

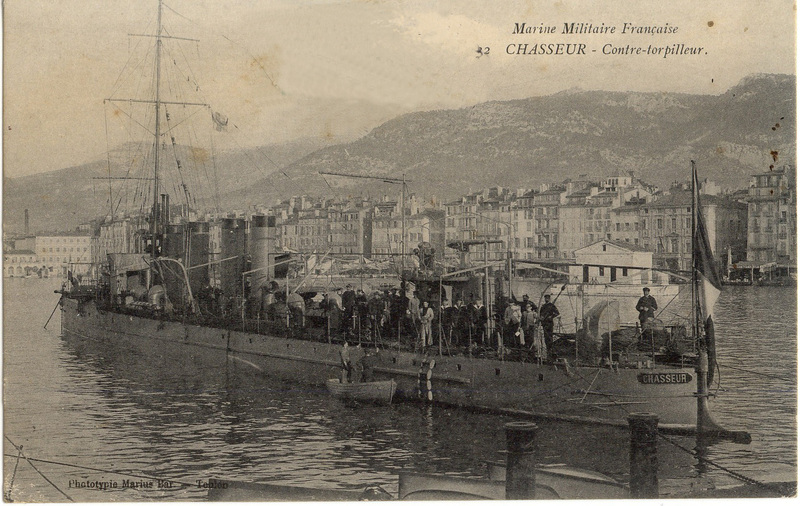
- A postcard of Chasseur at anchor

Class overview
- Name: Chasseur class
- Operators: French Navy; Peruvian Navy
- Preceded by: Voltigeur class
- Succeeded by: Bouclier class
- Built: 1909–1910
- In commission: 1909–1927
- Completed: 5
- Lost: 1
- Scrapped: 3

General characteristics
- Type: Destroyer
- Displacement: 450 t (443 long tons) (designed); 520 t (512 long tons) (deep load)
- Length: 64.2–65.4 m (210 ft 8 in – 214 ft 7 in) (p/p)
- Beam: 6.5–6.7 m (21 ft 4 in – 22 ft 0 in)
- Draft: 3.1 m (10 ft 2 in)
- Installed power: 3–4 water-tube boilers; 7,200 shp (5,369 kW)
- Propulsion: 3 shafts; 3 steam turbines
- Speed: 28 knots (52 km/h; 32 mph)
- Range: 1,400–1,500 nmi (2,600–2,800 km; 1,600–1,700 mi) at 10 knots (19 km/h; 12 mph)
- Complement: 77–79
- Armament: 6 × 65 mm (2.6 in) guns; 3 × 450 mm (17.7 in) torpedo tubes

The Chasseur class consisted of four destroyers built for the French Navy during the first decade of the twentieth century. They saw service during the First World War. One ship was sunk during the war and the survivors were scrapped afterwards. A fifth ship was sold to Peru.

== Design and description ==
The Chasseur class was based on the earlier Spahi class, albeit with oil-fired boilers. They had a length between perpendiculars of 64.2–65.4 meters (210 ft 8 in – 214 ft 7 in), a beam of 6.5–6.7 meters (21 ft 4 in – 22 ft 0 in), and a draft of 3.1 meters (10 ft 2 in). Designed to displaced 450 metric tons (443 long tons), the ships displaced 520 t (512 long tons) at deep load. Their crews numbered 77–179 men.

The destroyers were powered by three Parsons direct-drive steam turbines, each driving one propeller shafts using steam provided by four water-tube boilers of two different types. The engines were designed to produce 7,200 shaft horsepower (5,400 kW) which was intended to give the ships a speed of 28 knots (52 km/h; 32 mph); during their sea trials, the destroyers demonstrated speeds of 28.6–31 knots (53.0–57.4 km/h; 32.9–35.7 mph). The ships carried 135 t (133 long tons) of fuel oil (Cavalier still used coal) which gave them a range of 1,520 nautical miles (2,820 km; 1,750 mi) at a cruising speed of 10 knots (19 km/h; 12 mph).

The primary armament of the Chasseur-class ships consisted of six 65-millimeter (2.6 in) Modèle 1902 guns in single mounts, one each fore and aft of the superstructure and the others were distributed amidships. They were also fitted with three 450-millimeter (17.7 in) torpedo tubes. One of these was in a fixed mount in the bow and the other two were on single rotating mounts amidships.

== Ships ==
Name	Builder	Launched	Fate
Chasseur	Chantiers et Ateliers Augustin Normand, Le Havre	20 February 1909	Struck, October 1919.
Actée	Schneider et Cie, Chalon-sur-Saône	1909	Sold incomplete to Peru as BAP Teniente Rodríguez in 1911; hulked in 1939.
Cavalier	Normand, Le Havre	9 May 1910	Training ship from 1914. Struck, December 1927.
Fantassin	Forges et Chantiers de la Méditerranée, La Seyne-sur-Mer	17 June 1909	Sunk after collision with Mameluck, 5 June 1916.
Janissaire	Ateliers et Chantiers de Penhoët, Saint-Nazaire	12 April 1910	Struck, October 1920.

== Bibliography ==
- Couhat, Jean Labayle (1974). French Warships of World War I. London: Ian Allan. ISBN 0-7110-0445-5.
- Freivogel, Zvonimir (2019). The Great War in the Adriatic Sea 1914–1918. Zagreb: Despot Infinitus. ISBN 978-953-8218-40-8.
- Gardiner, Robert & Gray, Randal (1985). Conway's All The World's Fighting Ships 1906–1921. London: Conway Maritime Press. ISBN 0-85177-245-5.
- Jordan, John (2026). "The French 450-Tonne Destroyers". In Jordan, John (ed.). Warship 2026. Osprey Publishing. pp. 111–128. ISBN 978-1-4728-7259-3.
- Osborne, Eric W. (2005). Destroyers - An Illustrated History of Their Impact. Santa Barbara, California: ABC-Clio. ISBN 1-85109-479-2.
- Prévoteaux, Gérard (2017). La marine française dans la Grande guerre: les combattants oubliés: Tome I 1914–1915 [The French Navy during the Great War: The Forgotten Combatants, Book I 1914–1915]. Collection Navires & Histoire des Marines du Mond. Vol. 23. Le Vigen, France: Éditions Lela presse. ISBN 978-2-37468-000-2.
- Prévoteaux, Gérard (2017). La marine française dans la Grande guerre: les combattants oubliés: Tome II 1916–1918 [The French Navy during the Great War: The Forgotten Combatants, Book II 1916–1918]. Collection Navires & Histoire des Marines du Mond. Vol. 27. Le Vigen, France: Éditions Lela presse. ISBN 978-2-37468-001-9.
- Roberts, Stephen S. (2021). French Warships in the Age of Steam 1859–1914: Design, Construction, Careers and Fates. Barnsley, UK: Seaforth Publishing. ISBN 978-1-5267-4533-0.
- Roche, Jean-Michel (2005). "Classement par types". Dictionnaire des bâtiments de la flotte de guerre française de Colbert à nos jours 2, 1870 - 2006. Toulon: Roche. ISBN 978-2-9525917-0-6. OCLC 165892922.
