= Voltigeur-class destroyer =

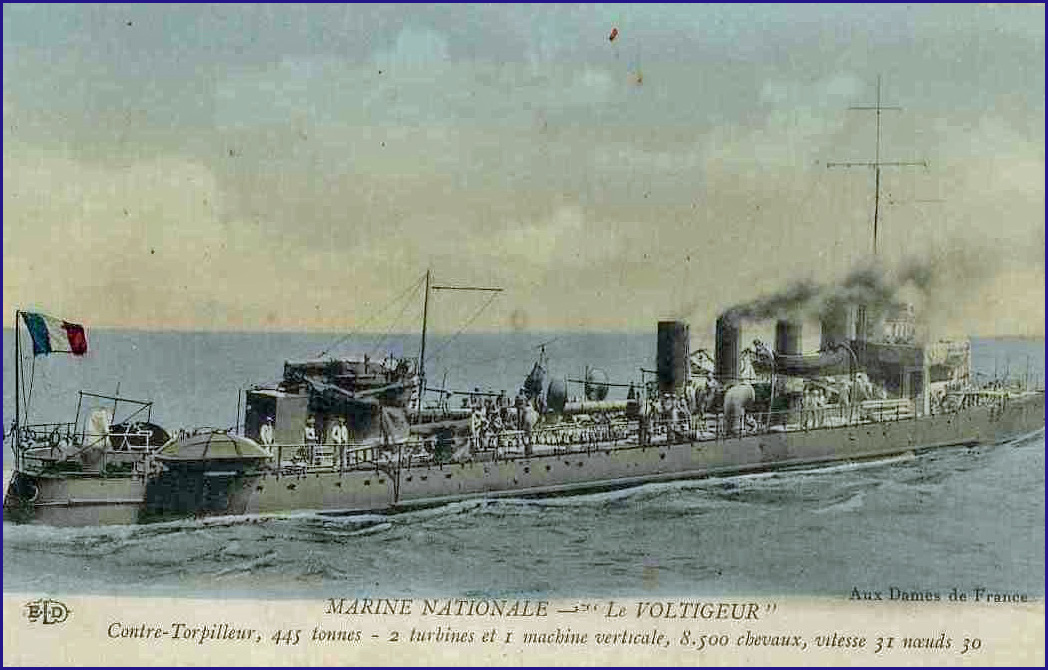
- A lithograph of Voltigeur

Class overview
- Name: Voltigeur class
- Operators: French Navy
- Preceded by: Spahi class
- Succeeded by: Chasseur class
- Built: 1908–10
- In service: 1910–21
- Completed: 2
- Scrapped: 2

General characteristics
- Type: Destroyer
- Displacement: 450 t (443 long tons) (designed); 590 t (581 long tons) (deep load)
- Length: 63–65.5 m (206 ft 8 in – 214 ft 11 in) (p/p)
- Beam: 6.4–6.8 m (21 ft 0 in – 22 ft 4 in)
- Draft: 2.9–3.1 m (9 ft 6 in – 10 ft 2 in)
- Installed power: 4 water-tube boilers; 7,500 shp (5,593 kW)
- Propulsion: 3 shafts; 1 triple-expansion steam engine and 2 steam turbines
- Speed: 28 knots (52 km/h; 32 mph)
- Range: 1,520 nmi (2,820 km; 1,750 mi) at 10 knots (19 km/h; 12 mph)
- Complement: 76–77
- Armament: 6 × single 65 mm (2.6 in) guns; 3 × single 450 mm (17.7 in) torpedo tubes

The Voltigeur class was a pair of destroyers built for the French Navy in the first decade of the 20th century. Both ships survived the First World War and were scrapped afterwards.

== Design and description ==
The Voltigeur class was based on the preceding Spahi-class destroyer, albeit with a different arrangement of propulsion machinery. They had a length between perpendiculars of 63–65.5 meters (206 ft 8 in – 214 ft 11 in), a beam of 6.4–6.8 meters (21 ft 0 in – 22 ft 4 in), and a draft of 2.9–3.1 meters (9 ft 6 in – 10 ft 2 in). Designed to displaced 450 metric tons (443 long tons), the ships displaced 590 t (581 long tons) at deep load.

The destroyers were powered by one triple-expansion steam engines and two direct-drive steam turbine. The steam engines drove the center propeller shaft while the turbine powered the two outer shafts, all using steam provided by four water-tube boilers of two different types. The engines were designed to produce 7,500 indicated horsepower (5,600 kW) which was intended to give the ships a speed of 28 knots (52 km/h; 32 mph). The ships carried 118 t (116 long tons) of coal which gave them a range of 1,520 nautical miles (2,820 km; 1,750 mi) at a cruising speed of 10 knots (19 km/h; 12 mph).

The primary armament of the Voltigeur-class ships consisted of six 65-millimeter (2.6 in) Modèle 1902 guns in single mounts, one each fore and aft of the superstructure and the others were distributed amidships. They were also fitted with three 450-millimeter (17.7 in) torpedo tubes. One of these was in a fixed mount in the bow and the other two were on single rotating mounts amidships.

== Ships ==
- Voltigeur - built by Ateliers et Chantiers de Bretagne, Nantes, launched 23 March 1909, decommissioned May 1920.
- Tirailleur - built by Forges et Chantiers de la Gironde, Bordeaux, launched 27 November 1908, decommissioned July 1921.

== Bibliography ==
- Couhat, Jean Labayle (1974). French Warships of World War I. London: Ian Allan. ISBN 0-7110-0445-5.
- Freivogel, Zvonimir (2019). The Great War in the Adriatic Sea 1914–1918. Zagreb: Despot Infinitus. ISBN 978-953-8218-40-8.
- Jordan, John (2026). "The French 450-Tonne Destroyers". In Jordan, John (ed.). Warship 2026. Osprey Publishing. pp. 111–128. ISBN 978-1-4728-7259-3.
- Jordan, John & Caresse, Philippe (2019). French Armoured Cruisers 1887–1932. Barnsley, UK: Seaforth Publishing. ISBN 978-1-5267-4118-9.
- Osborne, Eric W. (2005). Destroyers - An Illustrated History of Their Impact. Santa Barbara, California: ABC-Clio. ISBN 1-85109-479-2.
- Prévoteaux, Gérard (2017). La marine française dans la Grande guerre: les combattants oubliés: Tome I 1914–1915 [The French Navy during the Great War: The Forgotten Combatants, Book I 1914–1915]. Collection Navires & Histoire des Marines du Mond. Vol. 23. Le Vigen, France: Éditions Lela presse. ISBN 978-2-37468-000-2.
- Prévoteaux, Gérard (2017). La marine française dans la Grande guerre: les combattants oubliés: Tome II 1916–1918 [The French Navy during the Great War: The Forgotten Combatants, Book II 1916–1918]. Collection Navires & Histoire des Marines du Mond. Vol. 27. Le Vigen, France: Éditions Lela presse. ISBN 978-2-37468-001-9.
- Roberts, Stephen S. (2021). French Warships in the Age of Steam 1859–1914: Design, Construction, Careers and Fates. Barnsley, UK: Seaforth Publishing. ISBN 978-1-5267-4533-0.
- Smigielski, Adam (1985). "France". In Gray, Randal (ed.). Conway's All the World's Fighting Ships 1906–1921. Annapolis, Maryland: Naval Institute Press. pp. 190–220. ISBN 0-87021-907-3.
