= French destroyer Dague =

Destroyer of the French Navy

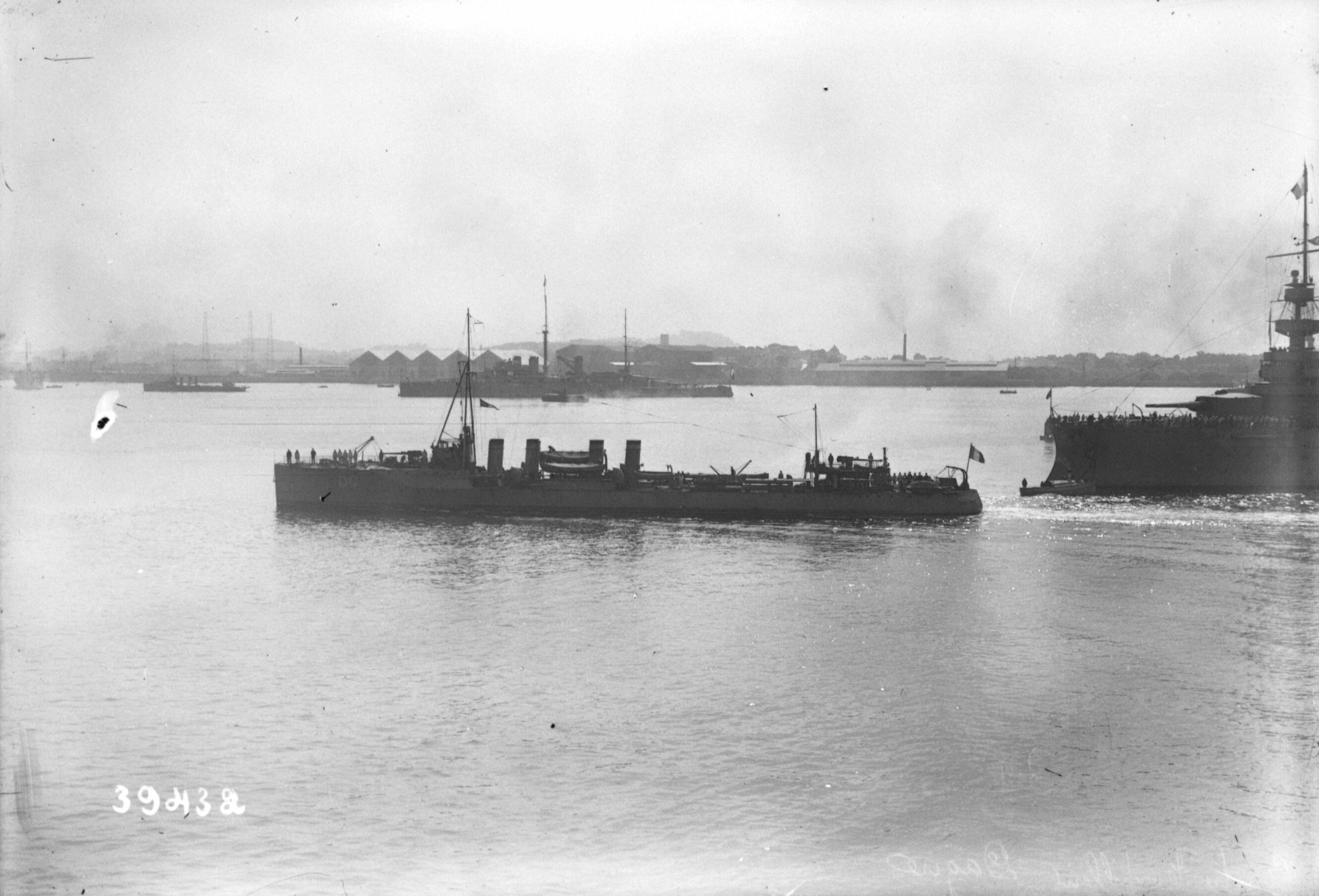
- Dague in harbor, 1914

History

France
- Name: Dague
- Namesake: Dagger
- Ordered: 26 August 1908
- Builder: Forges et Chantiers de la Gironde, Lormont
- Laid down: 1910
- Launched: 27 June 1911
- Completed: 1912
- Commissioned: 20 May 1912
- Stricken: 25 February 1915
- Fate: Sunk by a mine, 24 February 1915
- Status: Diveable wreck

General characteristics (as built)
- Class & type: Bouclier-class destroyer
- Displacement: 876 t (862 long tons) (normal)
- Length: 77.2 m (253 ft 3 in) (o/a)
- Beam: 8.04 m (26 ft 5 in)
- Draft: 2.94 m (9 ft 8 in)
- Installed power: 4 du Temple boilers; 13,500 shp (10,067 kW)
- Propulsion: 2 shafts; 2 steam turbines
- Speed: 30 knots (56 km/h; 35 mph)
- Range: 1,200–1,400 nmi (2,222–2,593 km; 1,381–1,611 mi) at 12–14 knots (22–26 km/h; 14–16 mph)
- Complement: 77–84
- Armament: 2 × single 100 mm (3.9 in) guns; 4 × single 65 mm (2.6 in) guns; 2 × twin 450 mm (17.7 in) torpedo tubes

Dague was one of a dozen Bouclier-class destroyers built for the French Navy in the first decade of the 20th century. Completed in 1912, the ship was initially assigned to the 1st Naval Army (1^{ère} Armée Navale) in the Mediterranean Sea. During the First World War, she escorted the battle fleet during the Battle of Antivari off the coast of Montenegro in August 1914 and escorted multiple convoys to Montenegro over the next six months. Dague struck a mine in Antivari harbor in February 1915 and sank with the loss of 38 crewmen.

== Design and description ==
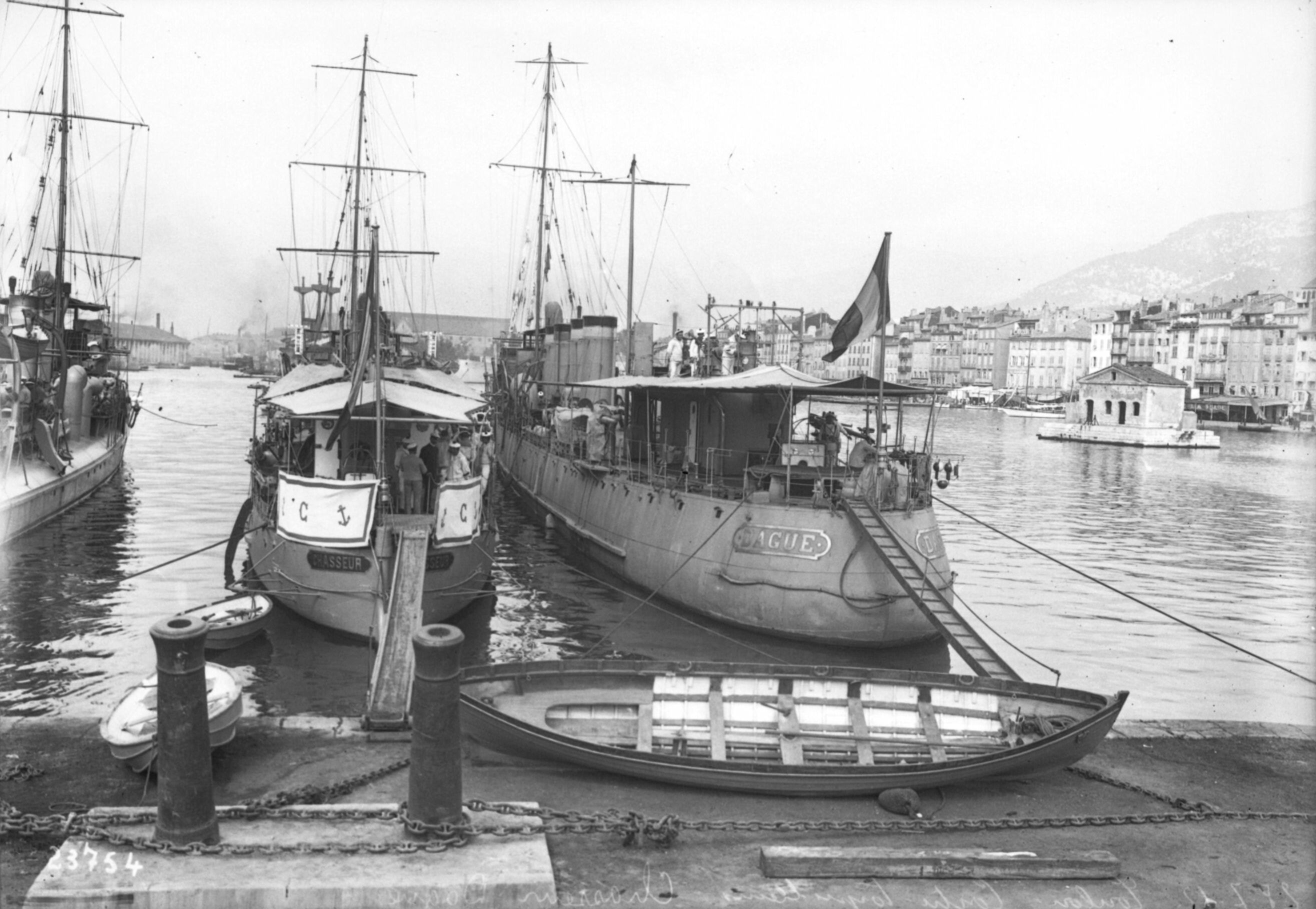
Rear view of destroyers Chasseur (left) and Dague (right) in Toulon, 1912

The Boucliers were the first class of destroyers designed in response to a new doctrine for their use. Nearly double the size of previous classes and more powerfully armed, they were built to a general specification and each shipyard was allowed to determine the best way to meet that specification. Dague and her sister Cimeterre were built by the same shipyard and had an overall length of 77.2 meters (253 ft 3 in), a beam of 8.04 meters (26 ft 5 in), and a draft of 2.94 meters (9 ft 8 in). Dague displaced slightly less than her sister at 876 metric tons (862 long tons) at normal load. Their crew numbered 4 officers and 77–84 men.

The sisters were powered by a pair of Breguet steam turbines, each driving one propeller shaft using steam provided by four du Temple boilers. The engines were designed to produce 13,500 shaft horsepower (10,100 kW) which was intended to give the ships a speed of 30 knots (56 km/h; 35 mph). During her sea trials, Dague reached a speed of 32.84 knots (60.82 km/h; 37.79 mph). The ships carried enough fuel oil to give them a range of 1,200–1,400 nautical miles (2,222–2,593 km; 1,381–1,611 mi) at cruising speeds of 12–14 knots (22–26 km/h; 14–16 mph).

The primary armament of the Bouclier-class ships consisted of two 100-millimeter (3.9 in) Modèle 1893 guns in single mounts, one each fore and aft of the superstructure, and four 65-millimeter (2.6 in) Modèle 1902 guns distributed amidships. They were also fitted with two twin mounts for 450-millimeter (17.7 in) torpedo tubes amidships, one on each broadside.

== Construction and career ==
Dague was ordered on 26 August 1908 as part of the 1908 naval program from C.A. Gironde. She was laid down at the company's shipyard at Lormont near Bordeaux on the Gironde estuary in 1910. The ship was launched on 27 June 1911 and began her sea trials on 20 February 1912. Dague was commissioned on 20 May 1912 and was assigned to the 1st Destroyer Flotilla (1^{ère} escadrille de torpilleurs) of the 1st Naval Army in the Mediterranean. Shortly after the start of the First World War, the flotilla escorted the battle fleet during the Battle of Antivari on 16 August and when they bombarded the Austro-Hungarian naval base at Cattaro, Montenegro, on 1 September. Four days later, the fleet covered the evacuation of Danilo, Crown Prince of Montenegro, to the Greek island of Corfu. The flotilla escorted multiple small convoys loaded with supplies and equipment to Antivari (now known as Bar), Montenegro, beginning in October and lasting for the rest of the year, always covered by the larger ships of the Naval Army in futile attempts to lure the Austro-Hungarian fleet into battle. Amidst these missions, the 1st and 6th Flotillas were led by the French destroyer Dehorter as they conducted a sweep south of Cattaro on the night of 10/11 November in an unsuccessful search for Austro-Hungarian destroyers.

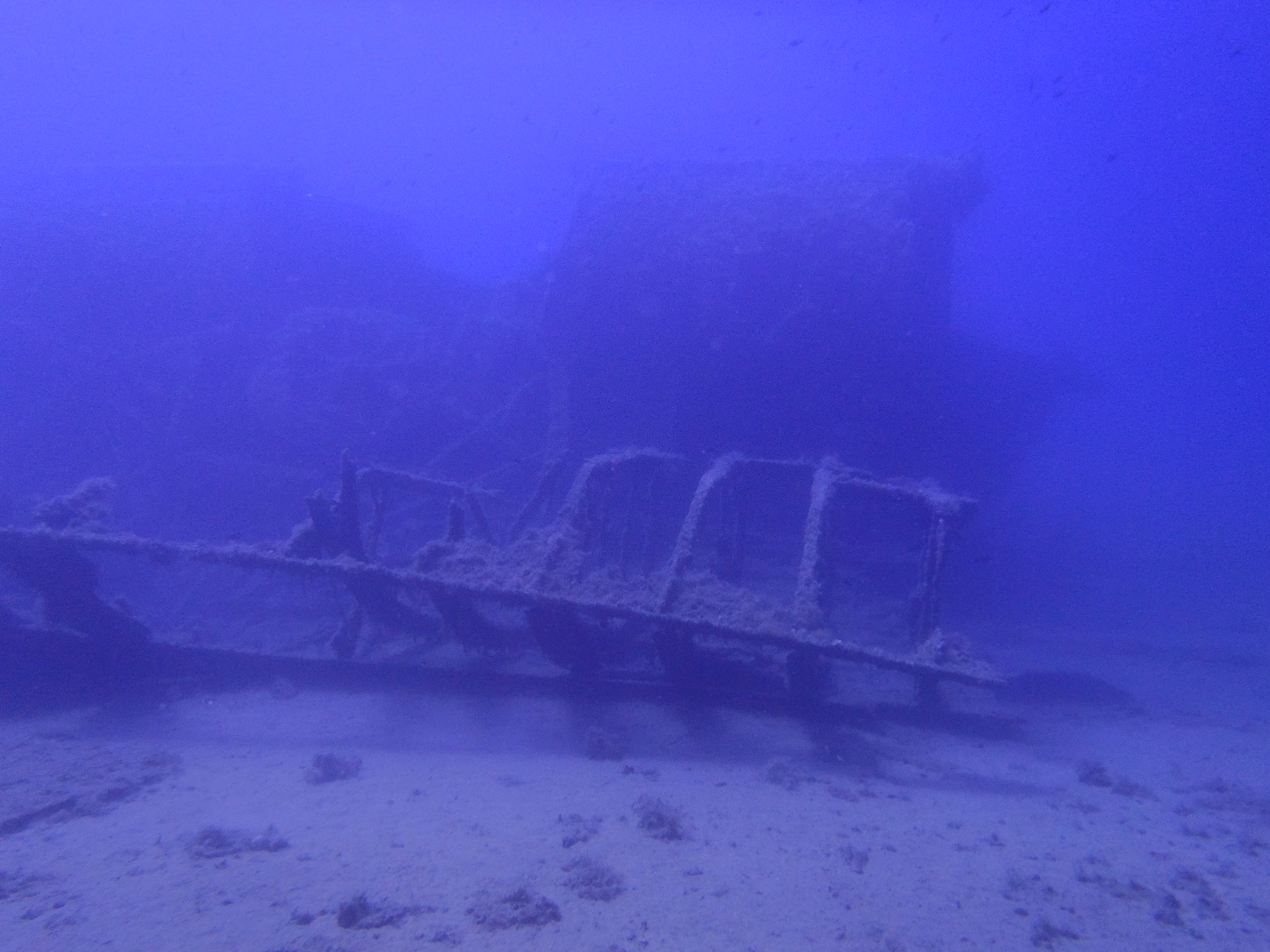
A portion of Dague's wreck

The torpedoing of the French battleship Jean Bart on 21 December 1914 caused a change in French tactics as the battleships were too important to risk to submarine attack. Henceforth, only the destroyers would escort the transports, covered by cruisers at a distance of 20–50 miles (32–80 km) from the transports. The first convoy of 1915 to Antivari arrived on 11 January and was followed by two others in over the next few weeks. An Austro-Hungarian force of one destroyer and two torpedo boats bombarded Antivari on 14 February and were able to lay some mines in the harbor. That same day Dague ferried General Paul Pau to Athens, Greece, for consultations with the Greek government. Dague and her sister Faulx were the close escort for the two transports of the next convoy that arrived on 23 February. The following evening, Dague was struck by a drifting mine in the harbor while at anchor and broke in half with the loss of 38 crewmen. The ship was struck from the navy list on 25 February.

The ship's wreck lay undisturbed until expansion of the harbor facilities in 1973 forced its removal. The wreck was cut into five pieces and moved to its current location, except for the stern. The bow has been buried by more recent construction, but the middle three sections are diveable at a depth of 18 m (59 ft).

== Bibliography ==
- Couhat, Jean Labayle (1974). French Warships of World War I. London: Ian Allan. ISBN 0-7110-0445-5.
- Freivogel, Zvonimir (2019). The Great War in the Adriatic Sea 1914–1918. Zagreb: Despot Infinitus. ISBN 978-953-8218-40-8.
- Prévoteaux, Gérard (2017). La marine française dans la Grande guerre: les combattants oubliés: Tome I 1914–1915 [The French Navy during the Great War: The Forgotten Combatants, Book I 1914–1915]. Collection Navires & Histoire des Marines du Mond. Vol. 23. Le Vigen, France: Éditions Lela presse. ISBN 978-2-37468-000-2.
- Roberts, Stephen S. (2021). French Warships in the Age of Steam 1859–1914: Design, Construction, Careers and Fates. Barnsley, UK: Seaforth Publishing. ISBN 978-1-5267-4533-0.
