= French destroyer Casque (1910) =

Destroyer of the French Navy

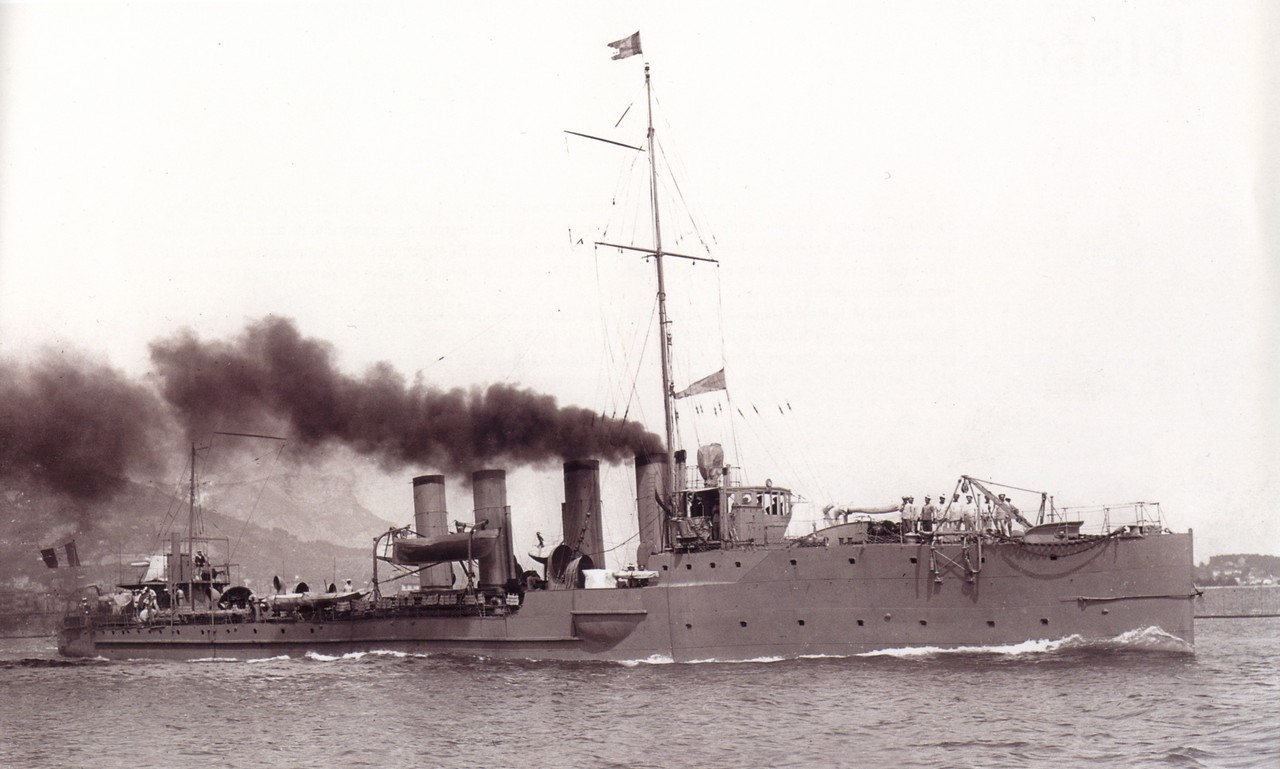
- Sister ship Bouclier underway

History

France
- Name: Casque
- Namesake: Helmet
- Builder: Forges et Chantiers de la Méditerranée, Le Havre
- Laid down: 1909
- Launched: 25 August 1910
- Completed: 1911
- Stricken: 26 March 1926
- Fate: Sold for scrap, 25 May 1927

General characteristics
- Class & type: Bouclier-class destroyer
- Displacement: 720–756 t (709–744 long tons)
- Length: 72.3–78.3 m (237 ft 2 in – 256 ft 11 in) (o/a)
- Beam: 7.6–8 m (24 ft 11 in – 26 ft 3 in)
- Draft: 2.9–3.3 m (9 ft 6 in – 10 ft 10 in)
- Installed power: 4 water-tube boilers; 13,000 shp (9,694 kW)
- Propulsion: 3 shafts; 3 steam turbines
- Speed: 30 knots (56 km/h; 35 mph)
- Range: 1,200–1,600 nmi (2,200–3,000 km; 1,400–1,800 mi) at 12–14 knots (22–26 km/h; 14–16 mph)
- Complement: 80–83
- Armament: 2 × 100 mm (3.9 in) Mle 1893 guns; 4 × 65 mm (2.6 in) Mle 1902 guns; 2 × twin 450 mm (17.7 in) torpedo tubes

Casque was one of a dozen Bouclier-class destroyers built for the French Navy in the first decade of the 20th century. She was sold for scrap in 1927.

== Design and description ==
The Bouclier class were designed to a general specification and varied significantly from each other in various ways. Casque had an overall length of 74–78.3 meters (242 ft 9 in – 256 ft 11 in), a beam of 7.6–8 meters (24 ft 11 in – 26 ft 3 in), and a draft of 2.9–3.1 meters (9 ft 6 in – 10 ft 2 in). Designed to displace 800 metric tons (787 long tons), Casque displaced 720–756 t (709–744 long tons) at normal load. Their crew numbered 80–83 men.

Casque was powered by three Parsons direct-drive steam turbines, each driving one propeller shaft using steam provided by four water-tube boilers. The engines were designed to produce 13,000 shaft horsepower (9,700 kW) which was intended to give the ships a speed of 30 knots (56 km/h; 35 mph). Casque handily exceed that speed, reaching 34.9 knots (64.6 km/h; 40.2 mph) during her sea trials. The ships carried enough fuel oil to give them a range of 1,200–1,600 nautical miles (2,200–3,000 km; 1,400–1,800 mi) at cruising speeds of 12–14 knots (22–26 km/h; 14–16 mph).

The primary armament of the Bouclier-class ships consisted of two 100-millimeter (3.9 in) Modèle 1893 guns in single mounts, one each fore and aft of the superstructure, and four 65-millimeter (2.6 in) Modèle 1902 guns distributed amidships. They were also fitted with two twin mounts for 450-millimeter (17.7 in) torpedo tubes amidships.

During World War I, a 45-millimeter (1.8 in) or 75-millimeter (3 in) anti-aircraft gun, two 8-millimeter (0.31 in) machine guns, and eight or ten Guiraud-type depth charges were added to the ships. The extra weight severely overloaded the ships and reduced their operational speed to around 26 knots (48 km/h; 30 mph).

== Construction and career ==
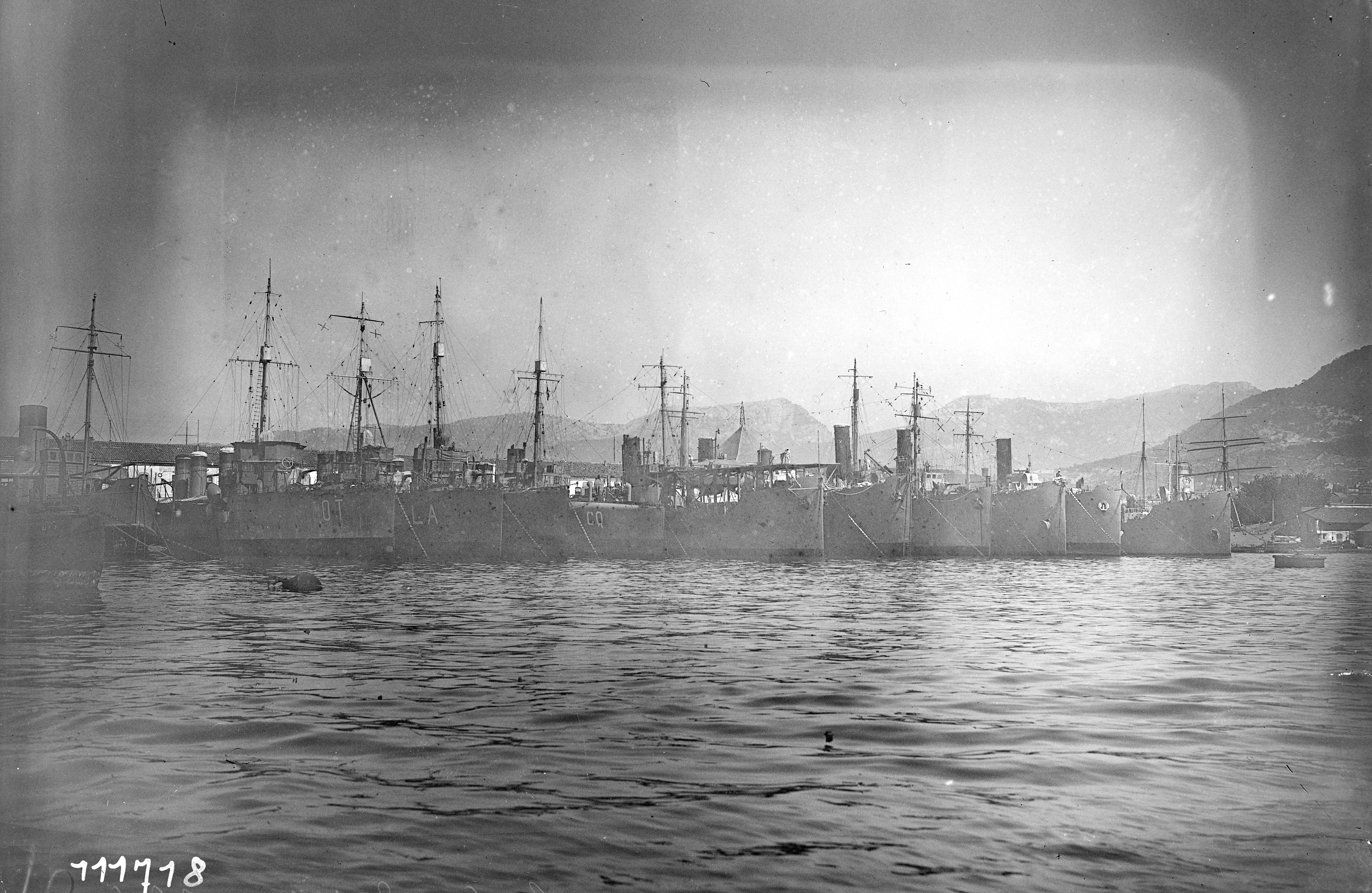
Casque (CQ, 5th from left) at anchor in Toulon with other French destroyers, 1926

Casque was ordered from Forges et Chantiers de la Méditerranée and was launched from its La Seyne-sur-Mer shipyard on 25 August 1910. The ship was completed in 1911. When the First World War began in August 1914, Casque was assigned to the 1st Destroyer Flotilla (1^{re} escadrille de torpilleurs) of the 1st Naval Army (1^{ère} Armée Navale). During the preliminary stages of the Battle of Antivari, Montenegro, on 16 August, the 1st, 4th and 5th Destroyer Flotillas were tasked to escort the core of the 1st Naval Army while the 2nd, 3rd and 6th Flotillas escorted the armored cruisers of the 2nd Light Squadron (2^{e} escadre légère) and two British cruisers. After reuniting both groups and spotting the Austro-Hungarian protected cruiser SMS Zenta and the destroyer SMS Ulan, the French destroyers played no role in sinking the cruiser, although the 4th Flotilla was sent on an unsuccessful pursuit of Ulan. Having broken the Austro-Hungarian blockade of Antivari (now known as Bar), Vice-Admiral (Vice-amiral) Augustin Boué de Lapeyrère, commander of the 1st Naval Army, decided to ferry troops and supplies to the port using a small requisitioned passenger ship, SS Liamone, escorted by the 2nd Light Squadron, reinforced by the armored cruiser Ernest Renan, and escorted by the destroyer Bouclier with the 1st and 6th Destroyer Flotillas under command while the rest of the 1st Naval Army bombarded the Austro-Hungarian naval base at Cattaro, Montenegro, on 1 September. Four days later, the fleet covered the evacuation of Danilo, Crown Prince of Montenegro, aboard Bouclier, to the Greek island of Corfu. The flotilla escorted multiple small convoys loaded with supplies and equipment to Antivari, beginning in October and lasting for the rest of the year, always covered by the larger ships of the Naval Army in futile attempts to lure the Austro-Hungarian fleet into battle. Amidst these missions, the 1st and 6th Flotillas were led by the French destroyer Dehorter as they conducted a sweep south of Cattaro on the night of 10/11 November in an unsuccessful search for Austro-Hungarian destroyers.

The torpedoing of the French battleship Jean Bart on 21 December caused a change in French tactics as the battleships were too important to risk to submarine attack. Henceforth, only the destroyers would escort the transports. After Italy signed the Treaty of London and declared war on the Austro-Hungarian Empire on 23 May 1915, Boué de Lapeyrère reorganized his forces to cover the approaches to the Adriatic and interdict merchant shipping of the Central Powers since the Royal Italian Navy (Regia Marina) now had primary responsibility for the Adriatic itself. His area of responsibility extended from Sardinia to Crete and he divided it into two zones with the 1st Light Squadron assigned to the western zone and the 2nd Light Squadron in the east. Those destroyers of the 1st Naval Army not assigned to reinforce the Italians were transferred to the newly formed 1st and 2nd Flotillas of the Naval Army (flotille d'Armée navale). The 1st and 3rd Destroyer Flotillas were assigned to the 2nd Flotilla of the Naval Army which was tasked to support the cruisers of the 2nd Light Division.

== Bibliography ==
- Couhat, Jean Labayle (1974). French Warships of World War I. London: Ian Allan. ISBN 0-7110-0445-5.
- Freivogel, Zvonimir (2019). The Great War in the Adriatic Sea 1914–1918. Zagreb: Despot Infinitus. ISBN 978-953-8218-40-8.
- Jordan, John & Caresse, Philippe (2019). French Armoured Cruisers 1887–1932. Barnsley, UK: Seaforth Publishing. ISBN 978-1-5267-4118-9.
- Prévoteaux, Gérard (2017). La marine française dans la Grande guerre: les combattants oubliés: Tome I 1914–1915 [The French Navy during the Great War: The Forgotten Combatants, Book I 1914–1915]. Collection Navires & Histoire des Marines du Mond. Vol. 23. Le Vigen, France: Éditions Lela presse. ISBN 978-2-37468-000-2.
- Prévoteaux, Gérard (2017). La marine française dans la Grande guerre: les combattants oubliés: Tome II 1916–1918 [The French Navy during the Great War: The Forgotten Combatants, Book II 1916–1918]. Collection Navires & Histoire des Marines du Mond. Vol. 27. Le Vigen, France: Éditions Lela presse. ISBN 978-2-37468-001-9.
- Roberts, Stephen S. (2021). French Warships in the Age of Steam 1859–1914: Design, Construction, Careers and Fates. Barnsley, UK: Seaforth Publishing. ISBN 978-1-5267-4533-0.
- Smigielski, Adam (1985). "France". In Gray, Randal (ed.). Conway's All the World's Fighting Ships 1906–1921. Annapolis, Maryland: Naval Institute Press. pp. 190–220. ISBN 0-87021-907-3.
