= French destroyer Cimeterre =

Destroyer of the French Navy

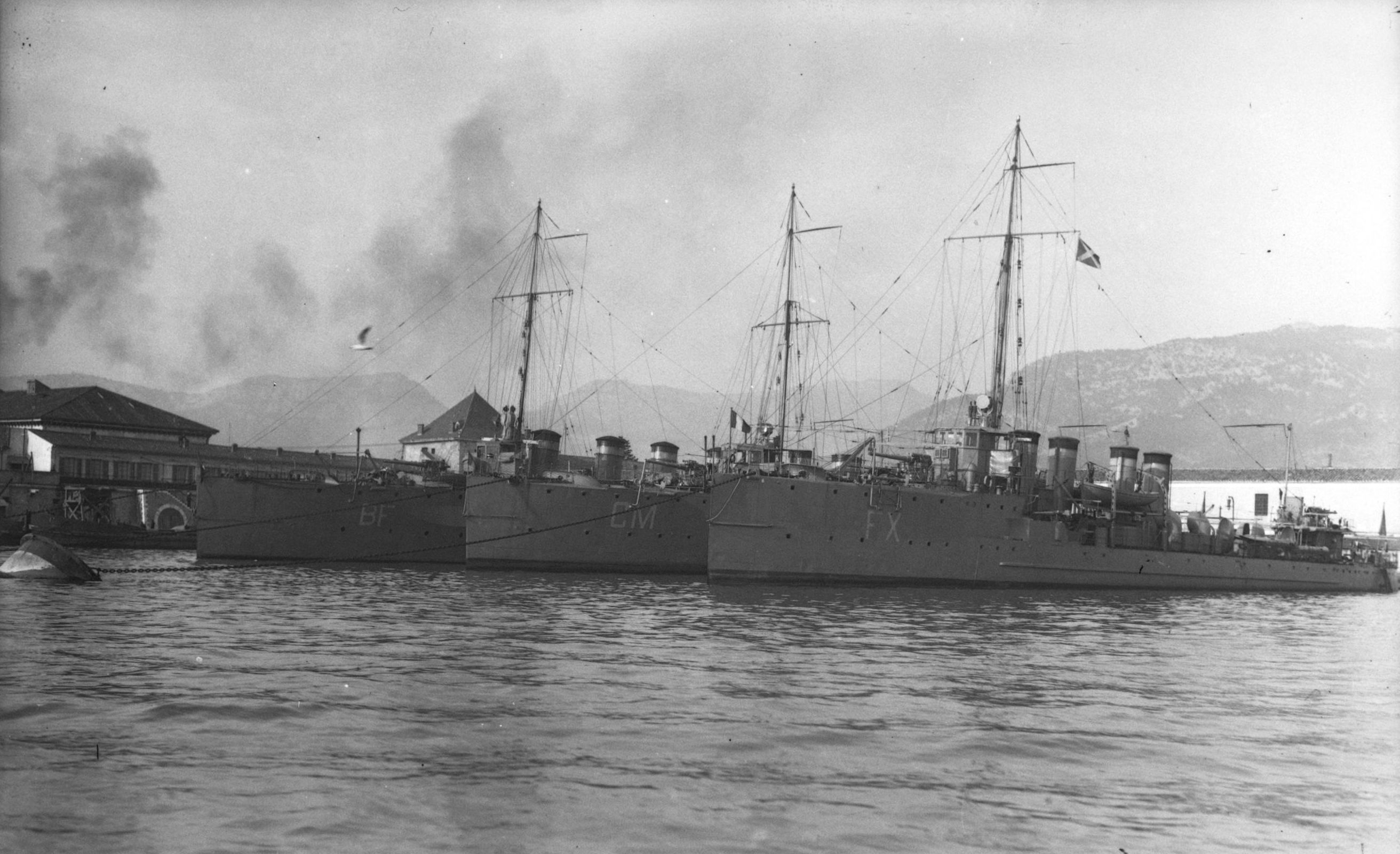
- Cimeterre between sister ships Boutefeu and Faulx, at anchor in Toulon, 1914

History

France
- Name: Cimeterre
- Namesake: Scimitar
- Builder: Forges et Chantiers de la Gironde, Lormont
- Laid down: 1909
- Launched: 13 April 1911
- Completed: 1912
- Stricken: 10 July 1926

General characteristics (as built)
- Class & type: Bouclier-class destroyer
- Displacement: 720–756 t (709–744 long tons)
- Length: 72.3–78.3 m (237 ft 2 in – 256 ft 11 in) (o/a)
- Beam: 7.6–8 m (24 ft 11 in – 26 ft 3 in)
- Draft: 2.9–3.3 m (9 ft 6 in – 10 ft 10 in)
- Installed power: 4 water-tube boilers; 13,000 shp (9,694 kW)
- Propulsion: 2 shafts; 2 steam turbines
- Speed: 30 knots (56 km/h; 35 mph)
- Range: 1,200–1,600 nmi (2,200–3,000 km; 1,400–1,800 mi) at 12–14 knots (22–26 km/h; 14–16 mph)
- Complement: 80–83
- Armament: 2 × 100 mm (3.9 in) Mle 1893 guns; 4 × 65 mm (2.6 in) Mle 1902 guns; 2 × twin 450 mm (17.7 in) torpedo tubes

Cimeterre was one of a dozen Bouclier-class destroyers built for the French Navy in the first decade of the 20th century.

== Design and description ==
The Bouclier class were designed to a general specification and varied significantly from each other in various ways. The ships had an overall length of 74–78.3 meters (242 ft 9 in – 256 ft 11 in), a beam of 7.6–8 meters (24 ft 11 in – 26 ft 3 in), and a draft of 2.9–3.1 meters (9 ft 6 in – 10 ft 2 in). Designed to displace 800 metric tons (787 long tons), they displaced 720–756 t (709–744 long tons) at normal load. Their crew numbered 80–83 men.

Cimeterre was powered by a pair of Breguet steam turbines, each driving one propeller shaft using steam provided by four water-tube boilers. The engines were designed to produce 13,000 shaft horsepower (9,700 kW) which was intended to give the ships a speed of 30 knots (56 km/h; 35 mph). Cimeterre handily exceed that speed, reaching 31.2 knots (57.8 km/h; 35.9 mph) during her sea trials. The ships carried enough fuel oil to give them a range of 1,200–1,600 nautical miles (2,200–3,000 km; 1,400–1,800 mi) at cruising speeds of 12–14 knots (22–26 km/h; 14–16 mph).

The primary armament of the Bouclier-class ships consisted of two 100-millimeter (3.9 in) Modèle 1893 guns in single mounts, one each fore and aft of the superstructure, and four 65-millimeter (2.6 in) Modèle 1902 guns distributed amidships. They were also fitted with two twin mounts for 450-millimeter (17.7 in) torpedo tubes amidships.

During World War I, a 45-millimeter (1.8 in) or 75-millimeter (3 in) anti-aircraft gun, two 8-millimeter (0.31 in) machine guns, and eight or ten Guiraud-type depth charges were added to the ships. The extra weight severely overloaded the ships and reduced their operational speed to around 26 knots (48 km/h; 30 mph).

== Construction and career ==
Cimeterre was ordered from Forges et Chantiers de la Gironde and was launched from its Lormont shipyard on 13 April 1911. The ship was completed in 1912. During the preliminary stages of the Battle of Antivari, Montenegro, on 16 August, the 1st, 4th and 5th Destroyer Flotillas were tasked to escort the core of the 1st Naval Army while the 2nd, 3rd and 6th Flotillas escorted the armored cruisers of the 2nd Light Squadron (2^{e} escadre légère) and two British cruisers. After reuniting both groups and spotting the Austro-Hungarian protected cruiser SMS Zenta and the destroyer SMS Ulan, the French destroyers played no role in sinking the cruiser, although the 4th Flotilla was sent on an unsuccessful pursuit of Ulan. Having broken the Austro-Hungarian blockade of Antivari (now known as Bar), Vice-Admiral (Vice-amiral) Augustin Boué de Lapeyrère, commander of the 1st Naval Army, decided to ferry troops and supplies to the port using a small requisitioned passenger ship, SS Liamone, escorted by the 2nd Light Squadron, reinforced by the armored cruiser Ernest Renan, and escorted by the destroyer Bouclier with the 1st and 6th Destroyer Flotillas under command while the rest of the 1st Naval Army bombarded the Austro-Hungarian naval base at Cattaro, Montenegro, on 1 September. Four days later, the fleet covered the evacuation of Danilo, Crown Prince of Montenegro, aboard Bouclier, to the Greek island of Corfu. The flotilla escorted multiple small convoys loaded with supplies and equipment to Antivari, beginning in October and lasting for the rest of the year, always covered by the larger ships of the Naval Army in futile attempts to lure the Austro-Hungarian fleet into battle. Amidst these missions, the 1st and 6th Flotillas were led by the French destroyer Dehorter as they conducted a sweep south of Cattaro on the night of 10/11 November in an unsuccessful search for Austro-Hungarian destroyers.

== Bibliography ==
- Couhat, Jean Labayle (1974). French Warships of World War I. London: Ian Allan. ISBN 0-7110-0445-5.
- Freivogel, Zvonimir (2019). The Great War in the Adriatic Sea 1914–1918. Zagreb: Despot Infinitus. ISBN 978-953-8218-40-8.
- Prévoteaux, Gérard (2017). La marine française dans la Grande guerre: les combattants oubliés: Tome I 1914–1915 [The French Navy during the Great War: The Forgotten Combatants, Book I 1914–1915]. Collection Navires & Histoire des Marines du Mond. Vol. 23. Le Vigen, France: Éditions Lela presse. ISBN 978-2-37468-000-2.
- Prévoteaux, Gérard (2017). La marine française dans la Grande guerre: les combattants oubliés: Tome II 1916–1918 [The French Navy during the Great War: The Forgotten Combatants, Book II 1916–1918]. Collection Navires & Histoire des Marines du Mond. Vol. 27. Le Vigen, France: Éditions Lela presse. ISBN 978-2-37468-001-9.
- Roberts, Stephen S. (2021). French Warships in the Age of Steam 1859–1914: Design, Construction, Careers and Fates. Barnsley, UK: Seaforth Publishing. ISBN 978-1-5267-4533-0.
- Smigielski, Adam (1985). "France". In Gray, Randal (ed.). Conway's All the World's Fighting Ships 1906–1921. Annapolis, Maryland: Naval Institute Press. pp. 190–220. ISBN 0-87021-907-3.
