= Bouclier-class destroyer =

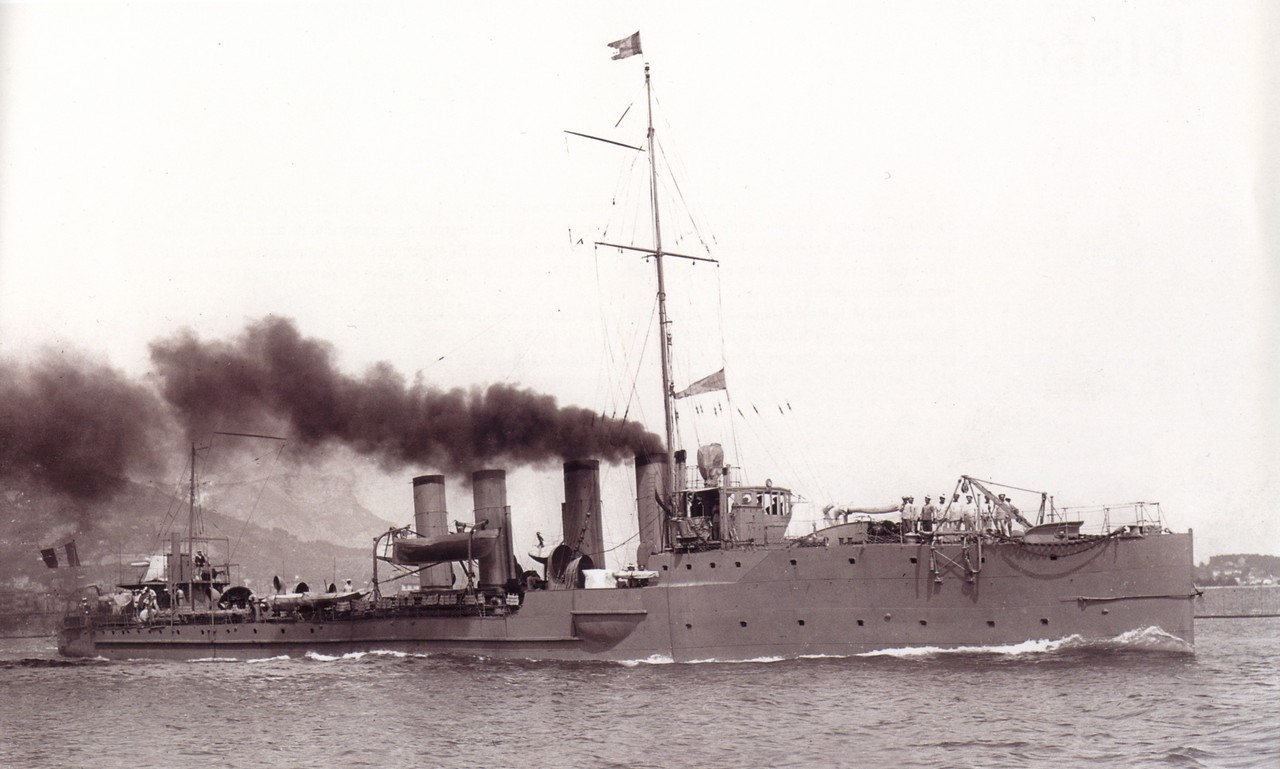
- Bouclier, lead ship of the class, circa 1914

Class overview
- Name: Bouclier class
- Operators: French Navy
- Preceded by: Chasseur class
- Succeeded by: Bisson class
- Built: 1909–1913
- In commission: 1911–1933
- Completed: 12
- Lost: 4
- Scrapped: 8

General characteristics
- Type: Destroyer
- Displacement: 703–809 t (692–796 long tons)
- Length: 72.3–78.3 m (237 ft 2 in – 256 ft 11 in) (o/a)
- Beam: 7.6–8 m (24 ft 11 in – 26 ft 3 in)
- Draft: 2.9–3.3 m (9 ft 6 in – 10 ft 10 in)
- Installed power: 13,000 shp (9,694 kW); 4 water-tube boilers
- Propulsion: 2–3 shafts; 2–3 steam turbines
- Speed: 30 knots (56 km/h; 35 mph)
- Range: 1,200–1,600 nmi (2,200–3,000 km; 1,400–1,800 mi) at 12–14 knots (22–26 km/h; 14–16 mph)
- Complement: 80–83
- Armament: 2 × 100 mm (3.9 in) Mle 1893 guns; 4 × 65 mm (2.6 in) Mle 1902 guns; 2 × twin 450 mm (17.7 in) torpedo tubes

The Bouclier class consisted of twelve destroyers built between 1910 and 1912 for the French Navy, four of which were lost during the First World War.

== Design and description ==
The Bouclier-class was nearly double the size of the preceding 450-metric-ton (443-long-ton) destroyers to match the increase in size of foreign destroyers. The French Navy issued a general specification that required oil-fired boilers, steam turbine propulsion and a uniform armament that allowed individual shipyards the freedom to design their ships as they saw fit. This allowed for some variations in size (from 72.32–78.3 meters (237 ft 3 in – 256 ft 11 in) in length) and machinery (Bouclier and Casque had three shafts, all the others had two, while Casque has three funnels, all the rest had four).

Bouclier was the shortest ship with an overall length of 72.32 meters and her sister ships ranged in length from 74 to 78.3 meters (242 ft 9 in to 256 ft 11 in). All of the ships had beams of 7.6–8 meters (24 ft 11 in – 26 ft 3 in) and drafts of 2.9–3.3 meters (9 ft 6 in – 10 ft 10 in). Bouclier and her sister Francis Garnier had the lightest displacements at 692 metric tons (681 long tons); the others displaced 720–756 metric tons (709–744 long tons) at normal load. Their crews numbered 80–83 men.

The destroyers were powered by two or three steam turbines of four different models, each driving one propeller shaft using steam provided by four water-tube boilers of four different types. The turbines were designed to produce 13,000 shaft horsepower (9,700 kW) which was intended to give the ships a speed of 30 knots (56 km/h; 35 mph). During their sea trials, they reached speeds of 29.3–35.5 knots (54.3–65.7 km/h; 33.7–40.9 mph). The ships carried 120–160 t (118–157 long tons) of fuel oil which gave them a range of 1,200–1,600 nautical miles (2,200–3,000 km; 1,400–1,800 mi) at cruising speeds of 12–14 knots (22–26 km/h; 14–16 mph).

The primary armament of the Bouclier-class ships consisted of two 100-millimeter (3.9 in) Modèle 1893 guns in single mounts, one each fore and aft of the superstructure, and four 65-millimeter (2.6 in) Modèle 1902 guns distributed amidships. They were also fitted with two twin mounts for 450-millimeter (17.7 in) torpedo tubes amidships.

During World War I, a 45-millimeter (1.8 in) or 75-millimeter (3 in) anti-aircraft gun, two 8-millimeter (0.31 in) machine guns, and eight or ten Guiraud-type depth charges were added to the ships. The extra weight severely overloaded the ships and reduced their operational speed to around 26 knots (48 km/h; 30 mph).

== Ships ==
Name	Builder	Launched	Fate
Bouclier	Chantiers et Ateliers Augustin Normand, Le Havre	29 June 1911	Struck, 15 February 1933
Boutefeu	Dyle et Bacalan, Bordeaux	2 May 1911	Sunk by mine laid by UC-25 off Brindisi, 15 May 1917, during the Battle of the Strait of Otranto
Capitaine Mehl	Ateliers et Chantiers de la Loire, St. Nazaire	20 April 1912	Struck, 10 July 1926
Casque	Forges et Chantiers de la Méditerranée, Le Havre	25 August 1910	Struck, 26 March 1926. Broken up, 1927.
Cimeterre	Forges et Chantiers de la Gironde, Bordeaux	13 April 1911	Struck, 10 July 1926
Commandant Bory	Dyle et Bacalan, Bordeaux	14 September 1912	Struck, 29 July 1926
Commandant Rivière	Forges et Chantiers de la Gironde, Bordeaux	2 October 1912	Struck, June 1933
Dague	Forges et Chantiers de la Gironde, Bordeaux	13 April 1911	Sunk by a drifting mine in Antivari Roads, 24 February 1915
Dehorter	Ateliers et Chantiers de Penhoët, Saint-Nazaire	18 April 1912	Struck, 1933
Faulx	Établissement de la Brosse et Fouché, Nantes	2 February 1911	Accidentally rammed and sunk by Mangini in Strait of Otranto, 18 April 1918
Fourche	Établissement de la Brosse et Fouché, Nantes	21 October 1910	Torpedoed and sunk by U-15, 23 June 1916
Francis Garnier	Chantiers et Ateliers Augustin Normand, Le Havre	1 October 1912	Struck, 10 February 1926

== Bibliography ==
- "BOUCLIER - Contre-torpilleur - marine - Forum Pages d'Histoire: marine". pages14-18.mesdiscussions.net. Archived from the original on 30 June 2015.
- Couhat, Jean Labayle (1974). French Warships of World War I. London: Ian Allan. ISBN 0-7110-0445-5.
- Freivogel, Zvonimir (2019). The Great War in the Adriatic Sea 1914–1918. Zagreb: Despot Infinitus. ISBN 978-953-8218-40-8.
- Gardiner, Robert & Gray, Randal (1985). Conway's All The World's Fighting Ships 1906–1921. London: Conway Maritime Press. ISBN 0-85177-245-5.
- Osborne, Eric W. (2005). Destroyers - An Illustrated History of Their Impact. Santa Barbara, California: ABC-Clio. ISBN 1-85109-479-2.
- Prévoteaux, Gérard (2017). La marine française dans la Grande guerre: les combattants oubliés: Tome I 1914–1915 [The French Navy during the Great War: The Forgotten Combatants, Book I 1914–1915]. Collection Navires & Histoire des Marines du Mond. Vol. 23. Le Vigen, France: Éditions Lela presse. ISBN 978-2-37468-000-2.
- Prévoteaux, Gérard (2017). La marine française dans la Grande guerre: les combattants oubliés: Tome II 1916–1918 [The French Navy during the Great War: The Forgotten Combatants, Book II 1916–1918]. Collection Navires & Histoire des Marines du Mond. Vol. 27. Le Vigen, France: Éditions Lela presse. ISBN 978-2-37468-001-9.
- Roberts, Stephen S. (2021). French Warships in the Age of Steam 1859–1914: Design, Construction, Careers and Fates. Barnsley, UK: Seaforth Publishing. ISBN 978-1-5267-4533-0.
- Roche, Jean-Michel (2005). "Classement par types". Dictionnaire des bâtiments de la flotte de guerre française de Colbert à nos jours. Vol. 2: 1870–2006. Toulon: Roche. ISBN 978-2-9525917-0-6. OCLC 165892922.
