= French cruiser Guichen (1897) =

Protected cruiser of the French Navy

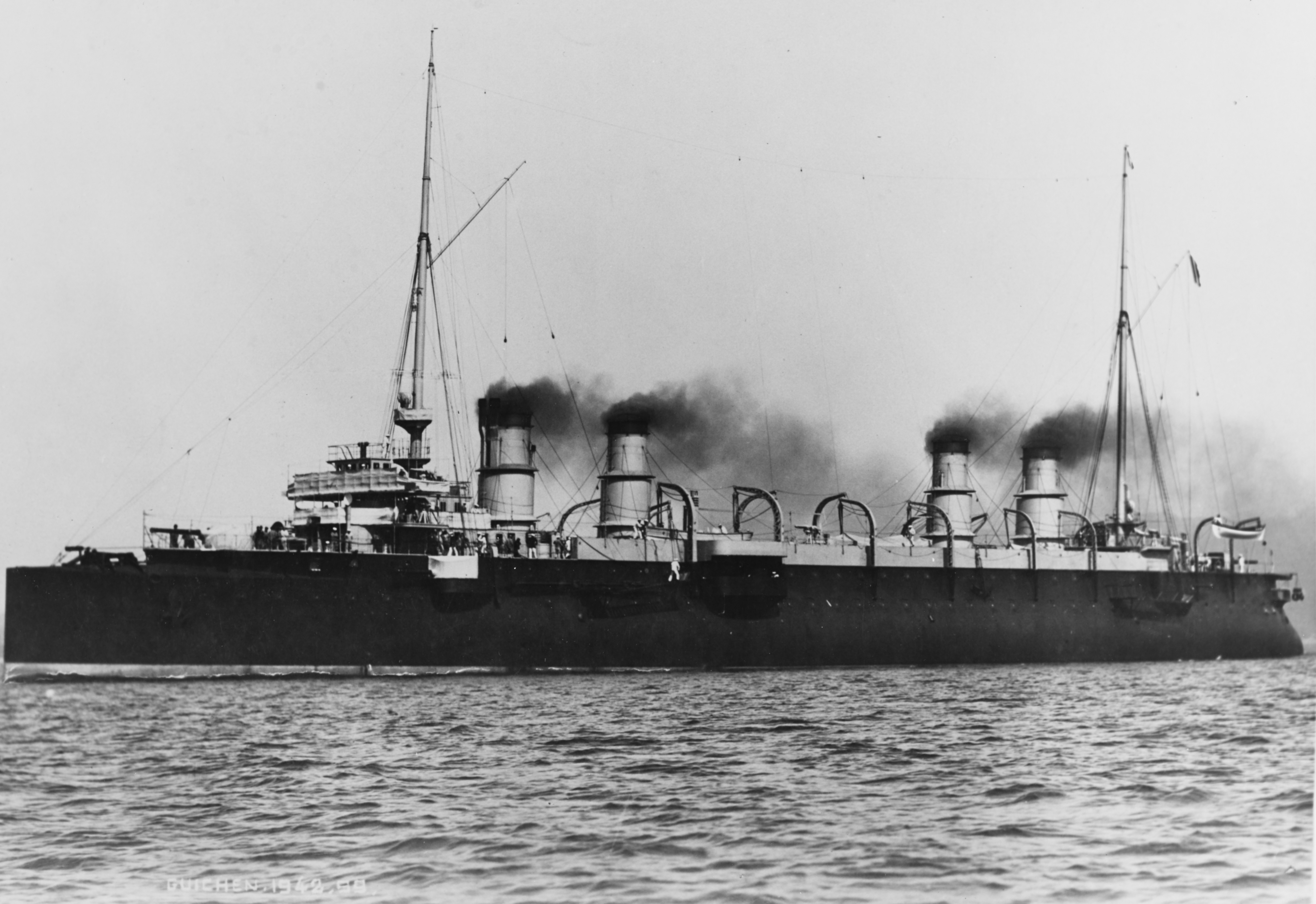
- Guichen

Class overview
- Operators: French Navy
- Preceded by: D'Entrecasteaux
- Succeeded by: Châteaurenault

History

France
- Name: Guichen
- Builder: Ateliers et Chantiers de la Loire
- Laid down: May 1896
- Launched: 26 October 1897
- Completed: 10 October 1898
- Commissioned: 9 March 1900
- Decommissioned: March 1921
- Stricken: 29 November 1921
- Fate: Broken up

General characteristics
- Type: Protected cruiser
- Displacement: 8,151 long tons (8,282 t)
- Length: 133 m (436 ft 4 in) long overall
- Beam: 16.71 m (54 ft 10 in)
- Draft: 7.5 m (24 ft 7 in)
- Installed power: 36 × water-tube boilers; 25,000 indicated horsepower (19,000 kW)
- Propulsion: 3 × triple-expansion steam engines; 3 × screw propellers
- Speed: 23.5 knots (43.5 km/h; 27.0 mph)
- Range: 8,430 nmi (15,610 km; 9,700 mi) at 10 knots (19 km/h; 12 mph)
- Crew: 594–604
- Armament: 2 × 164 mm (6.5 in) guns; 6 × 138 mm (5.4 in) guns; 10 × 47 mm (1.9 in) guns; 5 × 37 mm (1.5 in) guns; 2 × 450 mm (17.7 in) torpedo tubes
- Armor: Deck: 40 to 100 mm (1.6 to 3.9 in); Conning tower: 160 mm (6.3 in); Gun shields: 55 mm (2.2 in)

Guichen was a large protected cruiser built in the 1890s for the French Navy, the only member of her class. She was intended to serve as a long-range commerce raider, designed according to the theories of the Jeune École, which favored a strategy of attacking Britain's extensive merchant shipping network instead of engaging in an expensive naval arms race with the Royal Navy. As such, Guichen was built with a relatively light armament of just eight medium-caliber guns, but was given a long cruising range and the appearance of a large passenger liner, which would help her to evade detection while raiding merchant shipping.

The predicted Anglo-French war that spurred Guichen's design never came, and so her early career passed uneventfully. She initially served with the Mediterranean Squadron during her lengthy sea trials, followed by a stint in the Northern Squadron. She was sent to the Far East in response to the Boxer Uprising in Qing China by early 1901, returning to France the following year. Another deployment to East Asian waters came in 1905 and ended in 1907 with her return to France. She had been reduced to reserve by 1911 and saw little further activity in the following three years.

At the start of World War I in July 1914, the ship was mobilized into the 2nd Light Squadron and tasked with patrolling the western end of the English Channel. Guichen was transferred to the Mediterranean Sea in May 1915, serving initially with the main French fleet that blockaded the Austro-Hungarian Navy in the Adriatic Sea. Later in the year, she was reassigned to the Syrian Division that patrolled the coast of Ottoman Syria, where she helped to evacuate some 4,000 Armenian civilians fleeing the Armenian genocide. By 1917, she had been reduced to a fast transport operating between Italy and Greece. After the war, she continued transport duties, but after her crew mutinied in 1919, she was recalled to France, where she was eventually struck from the naval register in 1921 and broken up.

== Background and design ==
In the mid-1880s, elements in the French naval command argued over future warship construction; the Jeune École advocated building long-range and fast protected cruisers for use as commerce raiders on foreign stations while a traditionalist faction preferred larger armored cruisers and small fleet scouts, both of which were to operate as part of the main fleet in home waters. The latter course required a direct challenge to the larger British Royal Navy, and the proponents of the Jeune École hoped to avoid the significant expense of an arms race by attacking Britain indirectly, by way of attacks on her merchant shipping. By the end of the decade and into the early 1890s, the traditionalists were ascendant, leading to the construction of several armored cruisers of the Amiral Charner class, though the supporters of the Jeune École secured approval for one large cruiser built according to their ideas, which became D'Entrecasteaux.

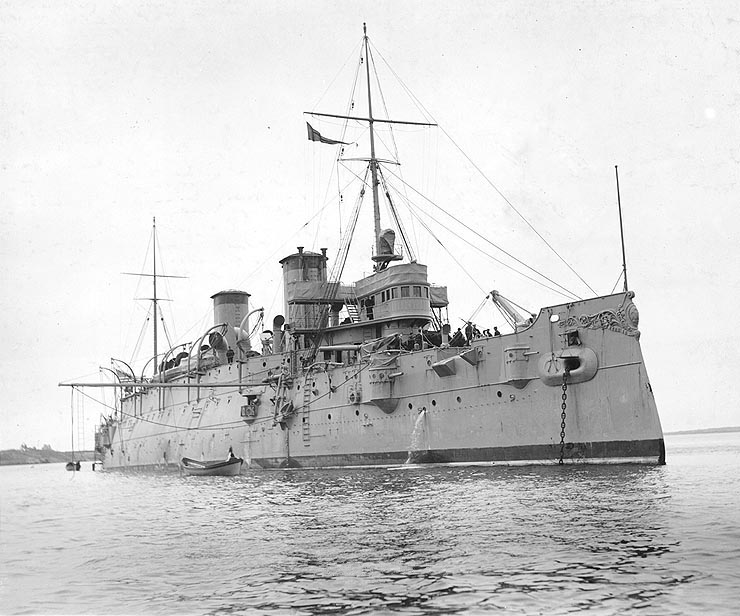
The Columbia-class cruiser USS Minneapolis, which strongly influenced the design for Guichen

These debates took place in the context of shifting geopolitical alliances and rivalries. The early 1890s was marked by serious strategic confusion in France; despite the Franco-Russian Alliance of 1891, which should have produced friction between the two countries and their imperial rival Britain, the French Navy was still oriented against the German-led Triple Alliance. This outlook was cemented in the naval program of 1894, but even the Navy's strategic planning remained muddled. The program authorized the large protected cruisers Guichen and Châteaurenault, both of which were intended as long-distance commerce raiders. These vessels were ideally suited to attack the extensive merchant shipping network of Britain, not the continental powers of Germany or Austria-Hungary.

In the early 1890s, the United States Navy built two very large and fast cruisers intended to raid merchant shipping in the Atlantic, the Columbia class. These ships greatly impressed many senior officers in the French Navy, including the French Naval Minister, Félix Faure, who issued requests for design proposals in late 1894. the chief characteristics were very high speed and great cruising range on a displacement of around 8,500 t (8,400 long tons; 9,400 short tons). Because the vessel was not intended to engage enemy cruisers, armament and armor could be kept light for a ship of this size. The Conseil des Travaux (Council of Works) issued its more detailed list of specifications to shipyards on 18 December 1894 to solicit design proposals.

Three shipyards submitted designs by early 1895, and on 15 January, the Conseil evaluated the submissions; they selected two, one from Ateliers et Chantiers de la Loire (which became Guichen) and one from Société Nouvelle des Forges et Chantiers de la Méditerranée (which became Châteaurenault). The design for Guichen had been prepared by Marie de Bussy, who based the hull form on his earlier designs, Davout and Dupuy de Lôme, both of which had met their design speeds. He had originally intended for Guichen to have an inverted bow like Dupuy de Lôme, but the Conseil requested a straight bow instead.

Both ships were intended to resemble passenger liners, which would help them evade discovery while conducting commerce raiding operations. The French cruisers suffered from several defects, however, including insufficient speed to catch the fast transports that would be used to carry critical materiel in wartime and their vast expense militated against their use to attack low-value shipping. Additionally, their weak armament precluded their use against enemy cruisers.

=== Characteristics ===
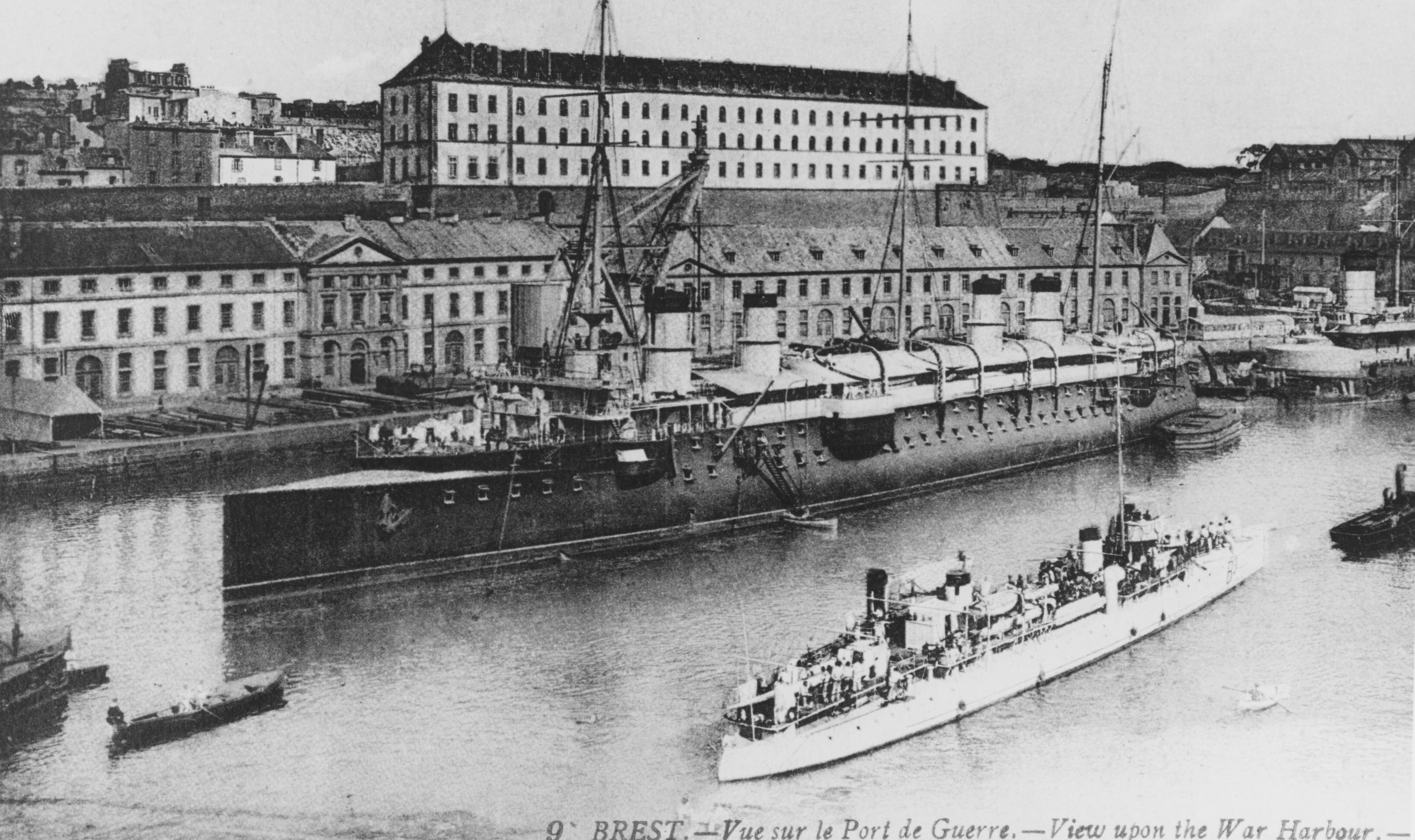
Guichen in Brest in 1905

Guichen was 133 m (436 ft 4 in) long both at the waterline and overall, with a beam of 16.71 m (54 ft 10 in) and an average draft of 7.5 m (24 ft 7 in). She displaced 8,281.9 t (8,151.1 long tons; 9,129.2 short tons). Her hull featured a straight stem and a pronounced tumblehome shape, as was typical for French warships of the period. She had a spar deck that extended for most of the length of the vessel. Guichen's superstructure consisted of a main conning tower forward with a small bridge structure atop it and a smaller secondary conning tower aft. She was fitted with three light pole masts for signaling purposes, though the center mast, serving as a support to Temperley coaling booms, was damaged in an accident in 1906 and was cut down and converted into a ventilation shaft. She was equipped with six searchlights. Her crew ranged from 594 to 604 officers and enlisted men.

The ship's propulsion system consisted of three vertical triple-expansion steam engines driving three screw propellers; she was the first French protected cruiser to adopt a three-shaft arrangement. Steam was provided by thirty-six mixed oil- and coal-burning, Lagrafel d'Allest water-tube boilers. These were divided into two widely-spaced groups and both groups were ducted into a pair of funnels. It was further development of an arrangement first used in D'Entrecasteaux, and symmetrical silhouette became a trademark of most following French large cruisers. Her machinery was rated to produce 24,000 indicated horsepower (18,000 kW) for a top speed of 23.5 knots (43.5 km/h; 27.0 mph), and she reached 25,163 ihp (18,764 kW) for 23.54 knots (43.60 km/h; 27.09 mph) during her initial speed tests. Coal storage amounted to 1,680 t (1,650 long tons; 1,850 short tons), which provided her a cruising radius of 8,430 nautical miles (15,610 km; 9,700 mi) at a speed of 10 knots (19 km/h; 12 mph).

Plan and profile sketch of Guichen

Despite her large size, Guichen carried a relatively light armament, since she was intended to engage unarmed merchant vessels, not other cruisers. Her main battery consisted of two 164 mm (6.5 in) M1893 45-caliber (cal.) quick-firing (QF) gun in single pivot mounts, fore and aft on the centerline, which fired a variety of shells, including solid cast iron projectiles, and explosive armor-piercing (AP) and semi-armor-piercing (SAP) shells. The muzzle velocity ranged from 770 to 880 m/s (2,500 to 2,900 ft/s). These guns were supported by a secondary battery of six 138 mm (5.4 in) M1893 45-cal. QF guns carried in sponsons, three guns per broadside. They were also supplied with cast iron, AP, and SAP projectiles, firing with a muzzle velocity of 730 to 770 m/s (2,400 to 2,500 ft/s). For close-range defense against torpedo boats, she was armed with a battery of ten 47 mm (1.9 in) 3-pounder Hotchkiss guns and five 37 mm (1.5 in) 1-pounder guns. The ship was also armed with a pair of 450 mm (17.7 in) torpedo tubes in her hull above the waterline. The torpedoes were the M1892 variant, which carried a 75 kg (165 lb) warhead and had a range of 800 m (2,600 ft) at a speed of 27.5 knots (50.9 km/h; 31.6 mph).

Armor protection consisted of Harvey steel. Guichen had a curved armor deck that was 55 mm (2.2 in) thick on the flat portion, which was about 0.79 m (2 ft 7 in) above the waterline. Toward the sides of the hull, it sloped downward to provide a measure of vertical protection, terminating at the side of the hull about 1.37 m (4 ft 6 in) below the waterline. The sloped portion increased in thickness to 100 mm (3.9 in), though toward the bow and stern, it was reduced to 40 mm (1.6 in). An anti-splinter deck was above the flat portion of the main deck with a cofferdam connecting it to the main deck. The forward conning tower was protected by 160 mm (6.3 in) on the sides; an armored supporting tube protected by 150 mm (5.9 in) of armor connected it to the interior of the ship. The ship's main guns were each fitted with gun shields that were 55 mm thick.

== Service history ==
Guichen early in her career, c. 1899

Guichen was built at the Ateliers et Chantiers de la Loire shipyard in Saint-Nazaire; the order was placed on 9 October 1895 and her keel was laid down there in late May 1896. The ship was launched on 26 October 1897, and she was commissioned for sea trials on 10 October 1898. On 4 December, she left Saint-Nazaire for Toulon, where she was to conduct her trials; she arrived there five days later, and began her evaluations in January 1899. Troubles during her sea trials necessitated alterations to the ship, which delayed her joining the fleet. After tests in June 1899 where she failed to meet her design speed, the decision was made to replace her screws, along with other corrections. She completed full-power trials in November, where she made a top speed of 23.54 knots (43.60 km/h; 27.09 mph). Though she was still not in full commission in 1899, Guichen was assigned to the Mediterranean Squadron, France's primary battle fleet. At that time, the unit consisted of six pre-dreadnought battleships, three armored cruisers, seven other protected cruisers, and several smaller vessels. Further evaluations were carried out through early 1900, including a test on 10 February to determine the speed developed using only the outboard propellers. Finally, on 9 March, she was placed in full commission.

On 17 April, Guichen was transferred to the Northern Squadron, based in the English Channel, though she remained there only briefly. On 23 June, she was ordered to East Asia in response to the Boxer Uprising in Qing China. By early 1901, eight other cruisers were assigned to the station. Fighting continued in Zhili province into February. With the fighting in China having been suppressed by late in the year, Guichen returned to France, arriving on 17 October, having traveled in company with the armored cruiser Amiral Charner. In 1902, Guichen took part in a visit of President Émile Loubet in Petersburg in Russia (along with Montcalm and smaller ships), and in 1903 she carried President Loubet to Dover. She returned to service with the Northern Squadron in 1903, which was kept in commission for six months of the year. In December 1903, the transport ship Vienne went missing after sailing from Rochefort, and Guichen was sent to search for the missing vessel. She searched from the northwest coast of France to the coast of Ireland without finding any trace of the ship. Guichen remained in the unit in 1904, but later that year, she was decommissioned so her crew could be used to commission the new armored cruiser Amiral Aube.

The ship returned to service for another tour in East Asia in 1905; during this period, her crew observed the Russian Second Pacific Squadron pass through Cam Ranh Bay in French Indochina in May on its way to the Battle of Tsushima of the Russo-Japanese War. On 9 May, the ship carried the order for the Russian fleet to leave Vân Phong Bay. By 1906, Guichen had become the flagship of the Naval Division of the Far East and Western Pacific. She lost her center mast, broken on 25 June, during coaling in Chefoo. She served as the flagship until 15 August, when D'Entrecasteaux arrived to relieve her. Guichen returned to France later that year. By 1911, Guichen had been assigned to the Reserve Division of the Northern Squadron, along with the armored cruisers Dupetit-Thouars, Gueydon, Montcalm, Jeanne d'Arc, and Kléber. The unit was based in Brest. Guichen served as a training ship for sail makers and carpenters at Brest in 1912 and 1913.

=== World War I ===
The French cruisers Guichen (right) and Châteaurenault (center background) and the battleship France (left) in Toulon during World War I

After the start of World War I in August 1914, Guichen was assigned to the 2nd Light Squadron, which at that time consisted of the armored cruisers Marseillaise, Amiral Aube, Jeanne d'Arc, Gloire,Gueydon, and Dupetit-Thouars. The unit was based in Brest, and was strengthened by the addition of several other cruisers over the following days, including the armored cruisers Kléber and Desaix, the protected cruisers Châteaurenault, D'Estrées, Friant, and Lavoisier, and several auxiliary cruisers. The ships then conducted a series of patrols in the English Channel in conjunction with a force of four British cruisers.

The French began withdrawing cruisers from the Channel over the following year, particularly after the British erected the Dover Barrage, a barrier of naval mines and nets patrolled by destroyers. Guichen was among the vessels transferred to the Mediterranean in May 1915. She initially joined the main fleet, based at Malta; toward the end of the month, Italy entered the war on the side of France and the Triple Entente. The Italian fleet took over responsibility for blockading the Austro-Hungarian Navy in the Aegean Sea and the French fleet was then charged with patrolling the area between Malta and Bizerte in French Tunisia. Guichen and the armored cruiser Amiral Charner were sent to join the 1st Light Division to patrol the area between Sardinia and Capo Colonna; the unit at that time consisted of the armored cruisers Waldeck-Rousseau, Ernest Renan, and Edgar Quinet. In late July, the ships were transferred to Algiers in French Algeria.

She was then transferred to the 3rd Squadron in the eastern Mediterranean and took part in a blockade of the Syrian coast, then part of the Ottoman Empire. During these patrols, she cruised with Desaix and the seaplane carrier Foudre on the northernmost section of the blockade in the vicinity of Latakia. The ships had little success, as most Ottoman shipping in the region consisted of small sailing vessels. The squadron's base at Port Said on the Suez Canal was deemed to be too far for Guichen, Desaix, and Foudre, so the French occupied the small island of Arwad to secure a closer anchorage. On 12 and 13 September, Guichen participated in the evacuation of some 4,000 Armenians from the city of Antioch, along with Amiral Charner, Desaix, D'Estrées, Foudre, and the British seaplane carrier HMS Anne. Guichen under Commander Jean-Joseph Brisson was the first vessel to observe distress signals that had been sent by the Armenians, who had been pursued by Ottoman forces during the Armenian genocide and besieged on Musa Dagh mountain. The French and British ships transported the evacuees to Port Said. Guichen herself transported almost half the overall number: 1,941 or 1,952 refugees.

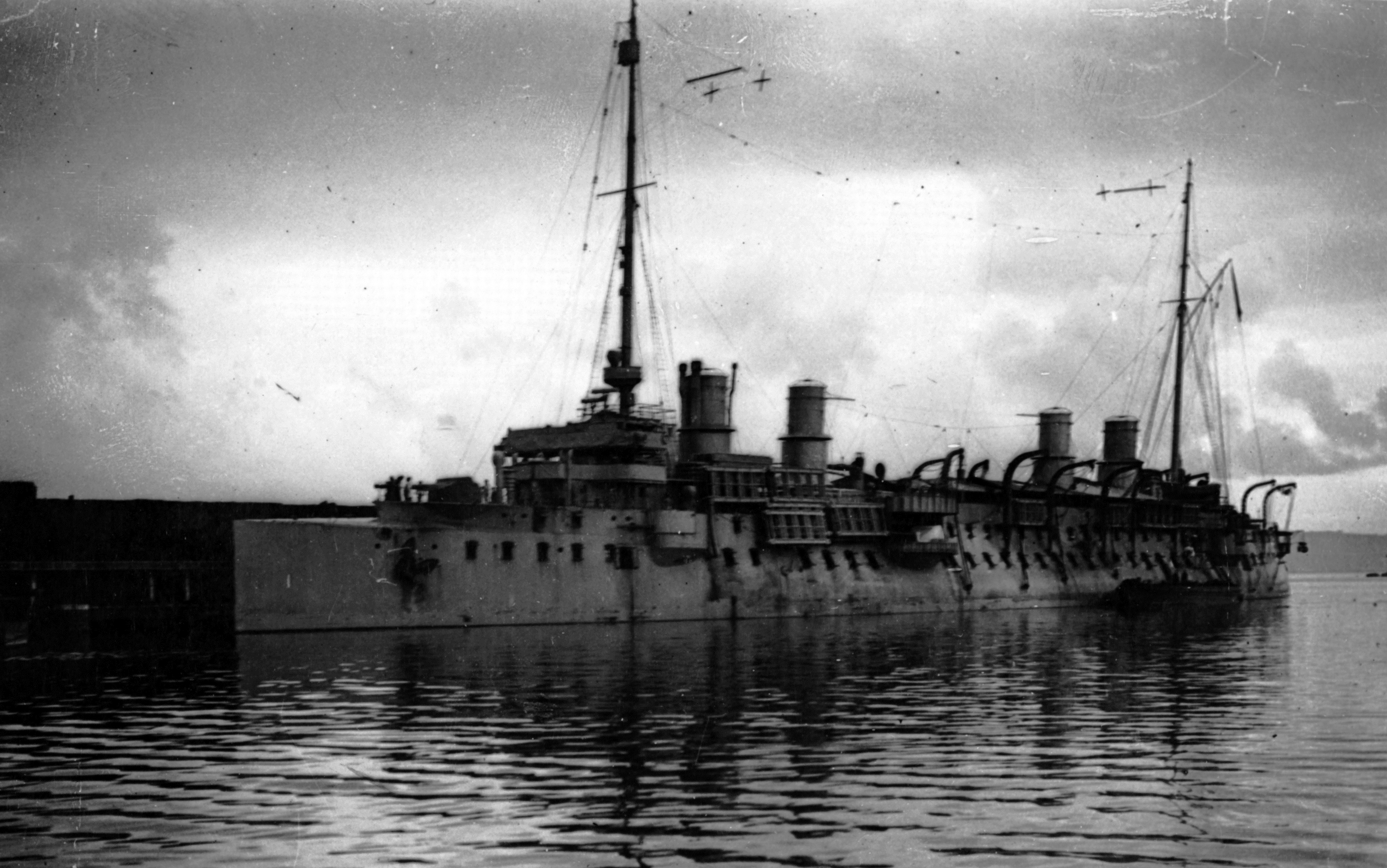
Guichen as a fast transport in Toulon, c. 1917

In late 1915, the 3rd Squadron was reorganized and new ships replaced Guichen. In April 1916, Guichen and Desaix were sent to Dakar in French Senegal to replace the 3rd Light Division. Guichen remained on the station only briefly, as a reorganization of the fleet's cruisers saw her replaced by the armored cruisers Dupleix and Kléber by July. In August, Guichen was outfitted at Brest for use as a troop transport, the primary alterations being the installation of additional cooking spaces and the fitting of more lifeboats. The following month, she began carrying troops around the Mediterranean, including Russian and Serbian soldiers to Salonika, Greece. She also brought troops to Itea and Corfu in Greece, among other locations. These duties continued through the end of the war.

=== Postwar ===
Following the war, she continued her troop transport duties, but by 1919, the conditions aboard the ship had become serious. In June, Guichen had withdrawn to the Gulf of Patras in western Greece, where her crew mutinied over the seemingly endless monotony and the poor conditions aboard the ship; Charles Tillon, who later led the Communist Party of France, played a significant role in the mutiny. Unrest also broke out among numerous French vessels, including in home ports, the North Sea, and elsewhere, owing to war weariness, a desire to return home, dissatisfaction with inequality aboard the ships, and anger with the fleet's anti-communist operations. The French authorities resorted to sending a battalion of Senegalese Tirailleurs to board Guichen and restore order. The ship thereafter returned to Brest, where she was laid up for boiler repairs, but by November 1920, she had been allocated to the reserve fleet in Landévennec. Guichen was decommissioned in March 1921 and condemned for disposal on 12 November. She was struck from the naval register on the 29th before being sold on 11 March 1922 at Brest.
