= Dupleix-class cruiser =

French class of armored cruisers

Coordinates: 48°17′13″N 4°50′50″W

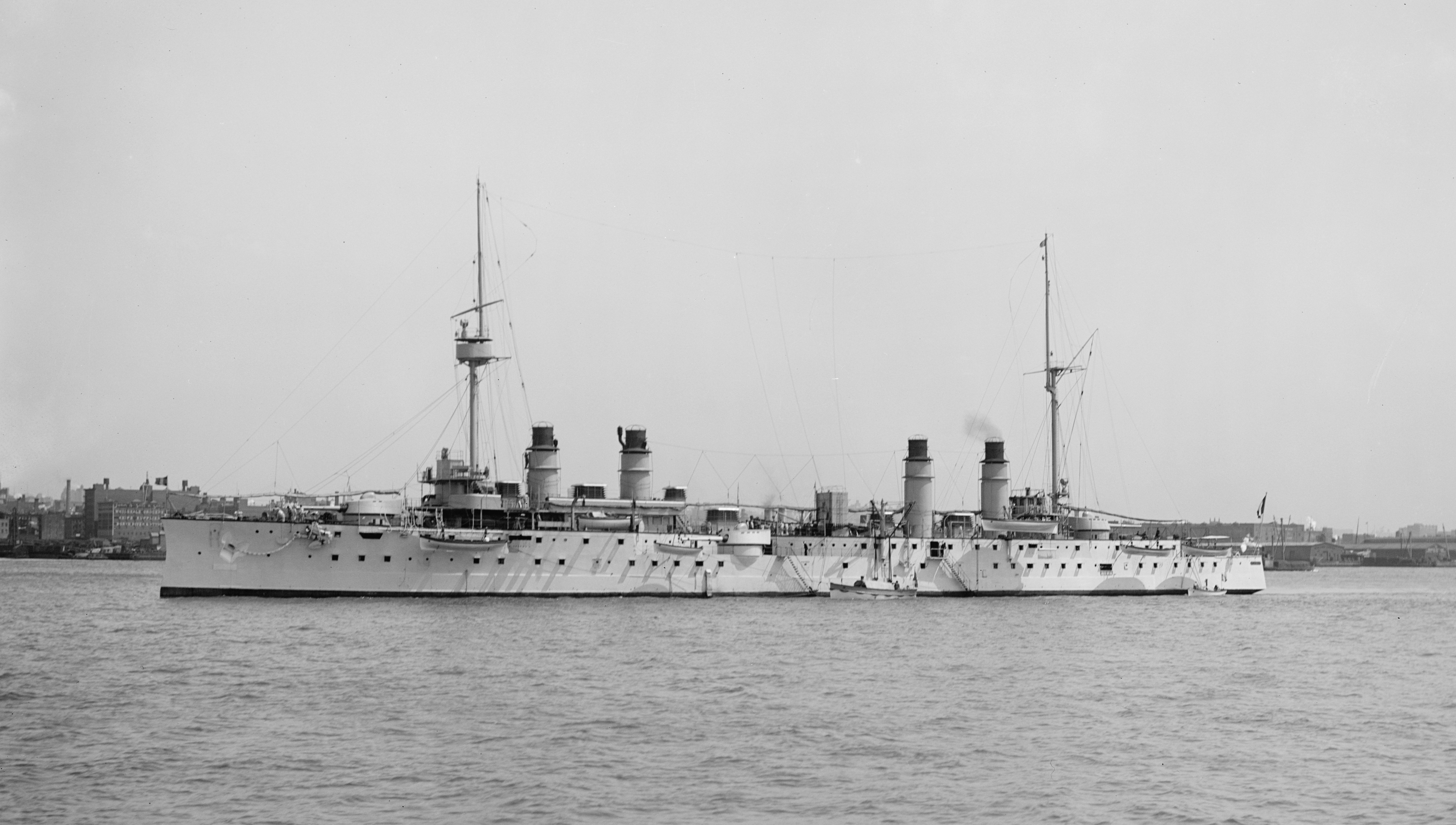
- Kléber at anchor at the Jamestown Exposition, June 1907

Class overview
- Name: Dupleix class
- Builders: Arsenal de Rochefort; Ateliers et Chantiers de la Loire; Forges et Chantiers de la Gironde
- Operators: French Navy
- Preceded by: Gueydon class
- Succeeded by: Gloire class
- Built: 1897–1904
- In commission: 1904–1921
- Completed: 3
- Lost: 1
- Scrapped: 2

General characteristics
- Type: Armored cruiser
- Displacement: 7,700 t (7,578 long tons)
- Length: 132.1 m (433 ft 5 in) (o/a)
- Beam: 17.8 m (58 ft 5 in)
- Draft: 7.46 m (24 ft 6 in)
- Installed power: 20 or 24 water-tube boilers; 17,100 PS (12,600 kW)
- Propulsion: 3 shafts, 3 triple-expansion steam engines
- Speed: 21 knots (39 km/h; 24 mph)
- Range: 6,450 nmi (11,950 km; 7,420 mi) at 10 knots (19 km/h; 12 mph)
- Complement: 19 officers and 550 crewmen; 24 officers and 583 men as flagship
- Armament: 4 × twin 164.7 mm (6.5 in) guns; 4 × single 100 mm (3.9 in) guns; 10 × single 47 mm (1.9 in) guns; 4 × single 37 mm (1.5 in) guns; 2 × 450 mm (17.7 in) torpedo tubes
- Armor: Belt: 84–102 mm (3.3–4.0 in); Turrets: 110 mm (4.3 in); Barbettes: 80–120 mm (3.1–4.7 in); Deck: 42–70 mm (1.7–2.8 in); Bulkheads: 40 or 84 mm (1.6 or 3.3 in); Conning tower: 100–120 mm (3.9–4.7 in)

The Dupleix class consisted of three armored cruisers built for the French Navy (Marine Nationale) at the beginning of the 20th century. Designed for overseas service and armed with eight 164.7-millimeter (6.5 in) guns, the three ships of the class were smaller and less powerfully armed than their predecessors.

Dupleix was initially assigned to the Atlantic Division (Division de l'Atlantique) as its flagship. Her sister ships were initially assigned to the Mediterranean Squadron (Escadre de la Méditerranée), although Desaix relieved Dupleix as flagship of the Atlantic Division in 1905. Dupleix was reduced to reserve from 1906 to 1909 before she was sent to the Far East in 1910 as the flagship of the ships there. Desaix and Kléber exchanged assignments in 1907, although the former ship returned to the Atlantic in 1908 before being placed in reserve from 1909 to 1914. Kléber was also placed in reserve in 1909, but she was reactivated two years later to join Dupleix in the Far East before returning home in 1913 to be placed in reserve again.

As tensions rose shortly before the beginning of World War I in August 1914, both Desaix and Kléber were reactivated. When the war began they were assigned to defend Allied shipping in the English Channel and intercept German ships attempting to pass through. At that time, Dupleix was still in the Far East. Before she was transferred to the Eastern Mediterranean in May 1915, the ship spent most of her time on escort duty in the Indian Ocean and Red Sea. Joined by Kléber that same month, they were two of the ships tasked to blockade the Aegean coast of Ottoman Turkey. Desaix was the first of the sisters to be transferred to the Mediterranean in February 1915 and spent the next year patrolling off the coast of the Ottoman Levant and in the central Mediterranean.

To help protect Allied shipping from German commerce raiders, the sisters were transferred to French West Africa for convoy escort duties in mid-1916 and remained there for the next year. Personnel shortages caused Kléber to be ordered home in mid-1917, but she struck a naval mine laid by a German submarine in June and sank; most of her crew was rescued by ships in the area. Dupleix followed her home in October and was placed in reserve. Desaix remained in West Africa for the rest of the war.

Dupleix was decommissioned in 1919 and Desaix was transferred to the Far East that same year. After the latter's return in 1921, she was also decommissioned. Dupleix was sold for scrap in 1922 and Desaix followed five years later.

== Background ==
French cruiser policy during the decade from the mid-1880s was incoherent as three different factions of the navy fought amongst themselves in four forums, the Navy Ministry (Ministre de la Marine), the Budgetary Committee of the Chamber of Deputies (Chambre des députés), the Supreme Naval Council (Conseil supérieur de la Marine) that proposed shipbuilding programs and ship characteristics to the Navy Minister, and the Board of Construction (Conseil des travaux) that was responsible for evaluating ship designs. The partisans of the Jeune École (Young School) wanted fast, lightly armed ships for commerce raiding, the traditionalists who wanted cruisers to defend the colonies and the modernists that desired armored cruisers and small scout cruisers to operate with the battle fleet.

A traditionalist Navy Minister, Vice Admiral (Vice amiral) Armand Besnard, succeeded the liberal politician Édouard Lockroy in April 1896, after the latter had authorized construction of the very large armored cruiser Jeanne d'Arc in the 1896 budget proposal, despite opposition from the Conseil des travaux. After rejecting a repeat 8,000-metric-ton (7,874-long-ton) protected cruiser like D'Entrecasteaux in the 1896 budget, Lockroy and his allies in the Budget Committee were willing to accept smaller cruisers in the following year's budget. The Conseil des travaux rejected Besnard's proposal for a 5,700-metric-ton (5,610-long-ton) protected cruiser in late 1896, saying that the navy "needed ships that can deal out and withstand punishment", but Besnard authorized construction of Jurien de la Gravière a few weeks later in the 1897 budget proposal anyway.

In the meantime, the Superior Naval Council had produced a new naval program that included an additional three each armored and protected cruisers for overseas service and five armored cruisers for service with the battle fleet. For the 1898 budget, Besnard proposed one battleship, two armored cruisers and two protected cruisers, but Lockroy and his allies, probably influenced by the ideas of Vice Admiral François Ernest Fournier, who believed that most cruiser tasks, including commerce raiding, would be better performed by armored cruisers smaller than Jeanne d'Arc, deleted the battleship and offered him 120 million francs for armored cruisers. Besnard initially proposed adding an enlarged version of Jeanne d'Arc, but this was rejected by the Conseil des travaux in early 1897. He countered with a revised program of three armored cruisers for overseas duties, which became the Dupleix class, and three Gueydon-class armored cruisers for the fleet. This satisfied the Superior Naval Council's objectives and all three factions as Fourier's ideas showed that armored cruisers could accomplish the Jeune École's preferred strategy of commerce raiding. It also neatly consumed the Budget Committee's 120 million francs as each of the Dupleixs cost about 19 million francs and the Gueydons 21 million francs.

Preliminary design work in December 1896 was for a 7,300-metric-ton (7,185-long-ton) ship armed with ten 164.7-millimeter (6.5 in) guns, two in single-gun turrets fore and aft of the superstructure and the remaining eight in casemates, protected by a 70-millimeter (2.8 in) waterline armor belt. The Conseil de travaux thought that the belt protection was too weak and that the ships needed more endurance. The naval architect Louis-Émile Bertin, recently appointed as the Director of Naval Construction (Directeur centrale des constructions navales), agreed and revised the design, sacrificing one pair of guns for more armor and additional coal, which increased its displacement. The Conseil accepted his revised design on 4 May 1897, although complaining about the deleted guns.

Dupleix was ordered from one of the naval dockyards on 18 December and orders for the other two followed on 28 December. Six months later, the Conseil proposed revising the armament, exchanging the single-gun turrets and the casemated guns for four twin-gun turrets, two replacing the turrets on the centerline and two wing turrets, one on each broadside, and adding four 100-millimeter (3.9 in) guns in casemates. By this time, preliminary work had already begun on Dupleix and Lockroy, recently returned to office, suggested suspending work on the ships while studies were done. Bertin opposed the changes, but produced drawings by early March 1899, despite the work load on his designers who were focused on other projects, and they were approved by the Minister on 6 April. The changes greatly retarded the progress on the two ships ordered from private dockyards, which had already been laid down in early 1899.

== Design and description ==
The Dupleix-class ships were much smaller and more lightly armed than Jeanne d'Arc. They measured 132.1 meters (433 ft 5 in) long overall with a beam of 17.8 meters (58 ft 5 in) and had a maximum draft of 7.46 meters (24 ft 6 in). The cruisers displaced 7,700 metric tons (7,578 long tons) as designed. To reduce biofouling, their hulls were sheathed in teak. The ships normally had a crew of 19 officers and 550 enlisted men, but accommodated 24 officers and 583 enlisted men when serving as flagships.

The ships' propulsion machinery consisted of three vertical triple-expansion steam engines, each driving a single propeller shaft, using steam provided by water-tube boilers, but the types of machinery differed between them. The first two ships, Dupleix and Desaix, had four-cylinder engines fed by 24 Belleville boilers with a working pressure of 20 kg/cm^{2} (1,961 kPa; 284 psi) while the last ship, Kléber, had three-cylinder engines that used 20 Niclausse boilers at 18 kg/cm^{2} (1,765 kPa; 256 psi). The engines of all three ships were designed to produce a total of 17,100 metric horsepower (12,600 kW) that was intended to give them a maximum speed of 21 knots (39 km/h; 24 mph). Despite exceeding their horsepower rating, only Kléber met or exceeded her designed speed during their sea trials, the ships attaining 20.6–21.5 knots (38.2–39.8 km/h; 23.7–24.7 mph) from 17,177–17,870 metric horsepower (12,634–13,143 kW). The sisters carried up to 1,200 metric tons (1,200 long tons; 1,300 short tons) of coal and could steam for 6,450 nautical miles (11,950 km; 7,420 mi) at a speed of 10 knots (19 km/h; 12 mph).

=== Armament ===
The ships of the Dupleix class had a main armament that consisted of eight quick-firing (QF) 45-caliber Canon de 164 mm Modèle 1893–96 guns. They were mounted in four twin-gun turrets, one each fore and aft of the superstructure and a pair of wing turrets amidships. The guns fired 54.9-kilogram (121 lb) shells at muzzle velocities ranging from 865 meters per second (2,840 ft/s). This gave them a range of about 10,800 meters (11,800 yd) at the turrets' maximum elevation of +15 degrees. Each gun was provided with 200 rounds, of which 44 shells were stowed in the turrets, which it could fire at a rate of three rounds per minute.

The cruisers' secondary armament consisted of four 45-caliber QF Canon de 100 mm Modèle de 1893 guns on single mounts in unprotected casemates in the hull. Their 16-kilogram (35 lb) shells were fired at muzzle velocities of 710 meters per second (2,300 ft/s) at a rate of six rounds per minute. At their maximum elevation of +20 degrees, the guns had a range of 9,000 meters (9,800 yd). The sisters carried 250 rounds for each gun. For defense against torpedo boats, they carried ten 47-millimeter (1.9 in) and four 37-millimeter (1.5 in) Hotchkiss guns, all of which were on single mounts. The ship were also equipped with two above-water 450-millimeter (17.7 in) torpedo tubes, one on each broadside.

=== Protection ===
The nickel steel armor belt of the Dupleix-class cruisers extended from 1.2 meters (3 ft 11 in) below the waterline to 1.995 meters (6 ft 7 in) above it and covered the entire length of the ship except for 18.9 meters (62 ft) of the stern where it ended in a transverse bulkhead 84 millimeters (3.3 in) thick. The armor was 102 millimeters (4 in) thick, although it reduced to 84 mm in front of the forward turret and thinned to 38 millimeters (1.5 in) at its lower edge.

The curved protective deck had a total thickness of 42 millimeters (1.7 in) on the flat and 70 millimeters (2.8 in) on the upper part of the curved portion where it met the bottom edge of the belt armor. Behind the belt armor was a highly subdivided watertight internal cofferdam. The face and sides of the gun turrets were protected by 110-millimeter (4.3 in) Harvey face-hardened armor plates, although their roofs were only 20 millimeters (0.79 in) thick. The armor plates of the gun barbettes was 120 millimeters (4.7 in) thick. The sides of the elliptical conning tower were 100 to 120 millimeters thick.

== Ships ==
Construction data
Name	Builder	Laid down	Launched	Commissioned	Fate
Dupleix	Arsenal de Rochefort	18 January 1899	28 April 1900	15 September 1903	Sold for scrap, 1922
Desaix	Ateliers et Chantiers de la Loire, Nantes	Early 1899	21 March 1901	5 April 1904	Sold for scrap, 1927
Kléber	Forges et Chantiers de la Gironde, Bordeaux	Early 1899	20 September 1902	4 July 1904	Sunk by a mine, 27 June 1917

== Service history ==
The first ship completed, Dupleix, was initially assigned to the Atlantic Division as its flagship. Her sisters were initially assigned to the Mediterranean Squadron's Light Squadron (Escadre légère), although Desaix relieved Dupleix as flagship of the Atlantic Division in 1905. In her turn Kléber relieved Desaix as flagship of the Atlantic Division in 1907. Desaix took Kléber's place in the Light Squadron. While visiting the United States later that year, the cruiser accidentally collided with and sank an American cargo ship and participated in the Jamestown Exposition, celebrating the tercentenary of the founding of Jamestown, Virginia. At the beginning of 1908, Kléber became flagship of the Moroccan Division (Division du Maroc).

The sisters all spent significant amounts of time before 1914 in reserve. Dupleix from 1906 to 1909, Desaix from 1909 to 1914 and Kléber in 1909–1910 and 1913–1914. Dupleix was reactivated in 1910 to serve as the flagship of the Far Eastern Division (Division navale de l'Extrême Orient) and was joined by Kléber in 1911–1912. Dupleix was replaced as flagship in 1913 by the larger and more spacious, albeit older, armored cruiser Montcalm.

=== World War I ===
After the French declaration of war on Imperial Germany in early August 1914, Dupleix was assigned to the British China Squadron and participated in the early stages of the blockade of the German-leased port of Qingdao. By late September, the ship was assigned to escort duties in the Indian Ocean and Red Sea. She was transferred to the newly formed Dardanelles Squadron (Escadre des Dardanelles) in May 1915, which was tasked to blockade the Aegean coast of Turkey. On the 26th, the cruiser was attacked by Ottoman coastal artillery at Bodrum while inspecting shipping, losing 27 men killed and 11 wounded.

Desaix and Kléber were reactivated in July 1914 and were assigned to the 3rd Light Division (3^{e} Division légère (DL)) of the 2nd Light Squadron which was tasked to defend the English Channel in conjunction with the British. The division was on station in the western end of the Channel by 4 August, where their mission was to intercept German shipping and provide distant cover for the smaller ships escorting convoys in the Channel. Improved defenses in the Channel and the stabilization of the front in early 1915 allowed the cruisers to be released from their tasks, so Desaix was assigned to the 3rd Squadron upon her arrival in the Eastern Mediterranean on 16 February. The squadron was tasked to patrol the area between Port Said, Egypt, and Alexandretta, Ottoman Syria. The cruiser was detached in May to assist the 1st Naval Army (1^{re} Armée Navale) in the Central Mediterranean with searching for German shipping near Italian ports. She rejoined the 3rd Squadron and was tasked to help blockade the Ottoman coast near the Turkish and Syrian border. In contrast to her sister, Kléber was transferred to the Dardanelles to support Allied forces in the Gallipoli Campaign in May where she joined the Dardanelles Squadron together with Dupleix and were assigned to blockade the coast of Asia Minor. Kléber collided with the Royal Australian Navy troopship HMT Boorara in the Aegean Sea on 17 July, damaging her bow. After the Kingdom of Bulgaria joined the Central Powers in mid-October, Kléber was one of the ship tasked to raid the Aegean coast of Bulgaria on 21 October.

The successes of German merchant raiders like Möwe in 1916 caused the Allies to transfer cruisers to the Atlantic to protect their shipping. The sisters were assigned to a newly raised 6th Light Division in July 1916 that was based in Dakar, French West Africa, with Kléber as the division's flagship. To release manpower for higher-priority patrol boats in 1917, the 6th DL was reduced to Dupleix and Desaix and renamed the Coast of Africa Division (Division navale de la côte d'Afrique) on 18 May; Contre-amiral (Rear Admiral) Louis Jaurès transferred his flag to Dupleix. En route to Brest, France, Kléber struck a mine and sank on 27 June that the German U-boat UC-61 had laid off the Iroise entrance to Brest. Nearby ships were able to rescue all but 38 of her crew.

The division was disbanded on 14 September and Dupleix sailed to Brest where she was placed in reserve on 15 October. Desaix remained at Dakar for the rest of the war, tasked to escort convoys in the South Atlantic. Dupleix was decommissioned on 1 May 1919 and stricken on 27 September from the Navy List. In 1920 Dupleix was towed to Landévennec and she was sold for scrap in 1922. Desaix returned to France after the war, but was assigned to the Far Eastern Division in 1919. Her service there was uneventful and the ship arrived back in France on 31 March 1921 after which she was decommissioned. Desaix was stricken from the Navy List on 27 July, but was not sold for scrap until 1927.

== Bibliography ==
- Chesneau, Roger & Kolesnik, Eugene M., eds. (1979). Conway's All the World's Fighting Ships 1860–1905. Greenwich, UK: Conway Maritime Press. ISBN 0-8317-0302-4.
- Corbett, Julian (1997) [1938]. Naval Operations to the Battle of the Falklands. History of the Great War: Based on Official Documents. Vol. I (2nd ed.). London; Nashville, Tennessee: Imperial War Museum in association with the Battery Press. ISBN 0-89839-256-X.
- Corbett, Julian (1997) [1940]. Naval Operations. History of the Great War: Based on Official Documents. Vol. III (2nd ed.). London; Nashville, Tennessee: Imperial War Museum in association with the Battery Press. ISBN 1-870423-50-X.
- Dai, Wei (September 2020). "A Discussion on French Armored Cruiser Identification: From the Gueydon Class to the Edgar Quinet Class". Warship International. LVII (3): 199–221. ISSN 0043-0374.
- Friedman, Norman (2011). Naval Weapons of World War One: Guns, Torpedoes, Mines and ASW Weapons of All Nations: An Illustrated Directory. Barnsley, UK: Seaforth. ISBN 978-1-84832-100-7.
- Jordan, John & Caresse, Philippe (2019). French Armoured Cruisers 1887–1932. Barnsley, UK: Seaforth Publishing. ISBN 978-1-5267-4118-9.
- Ropp, Theodore (1987). Roberts, Stephen S. (ed.). The Development of a Modern Navy: French Naval Policy, 1871–1904. Annapolis, Maryland: Naval Institute Press. ISBN 0-87021-141-2.
- Sieche, Erwin F. (1990). "Austria-Hungary's Last Visit to the USA". Warship International. XXVII (2): 142–164. ISSN 0043-0374.
- Silverstone, Paul H. (1984). Directory of the World's Capital Ships. New York: Hippocrene Books. ISBN 0-88254-979-0.
