= French ship Desaix =

Several ships of the French Navy have been named Desaix:

- French ship Desaix (1793), a 74-gun ship of the line originally named Tyrannicide
- French corvette Desaix, a screw corvette
- French cruiser Desaix, an armored cruiser
