= Desaix =

Desaix may refer to:

- Louis Desaix (1768–1800), French general
- French ship Tyrannicide (1793), a French Navy 74-gun ship of the line launched in 1793, renamed Desaix in 1800, and wrecked in 1802
- French cruiser Desaix, a French Navy armored cruiser in commission from 1904 to 1921
- Z5 Paul Jacobi, a destroyer transferred to the French Navy as Desaix after World War II
