= Jaurès =

Jaurès (pronounced [ʒɔʁɛs]) is a surname. Notable people with the surname include:

- Benjamin Jaurès (1823–1889), French Admiral and Senator, uncle of Jean Jaures
- Jean Jaurès (1859–1914), French socialist leader (assassinated)
- Louis Jaurès (1860–1937), French admiral and deputy, brother of Jean Jaurès
- Jean-Sébastien Jaurès (born 1977), French footballer

== See also ==
- Jaurès station and Boulogne–Jean Jaurès station, metro stations named after Jean
- Jaurès (song) by Jacques Brel
