= Columbia-class cruiser =

Class of American naval ships

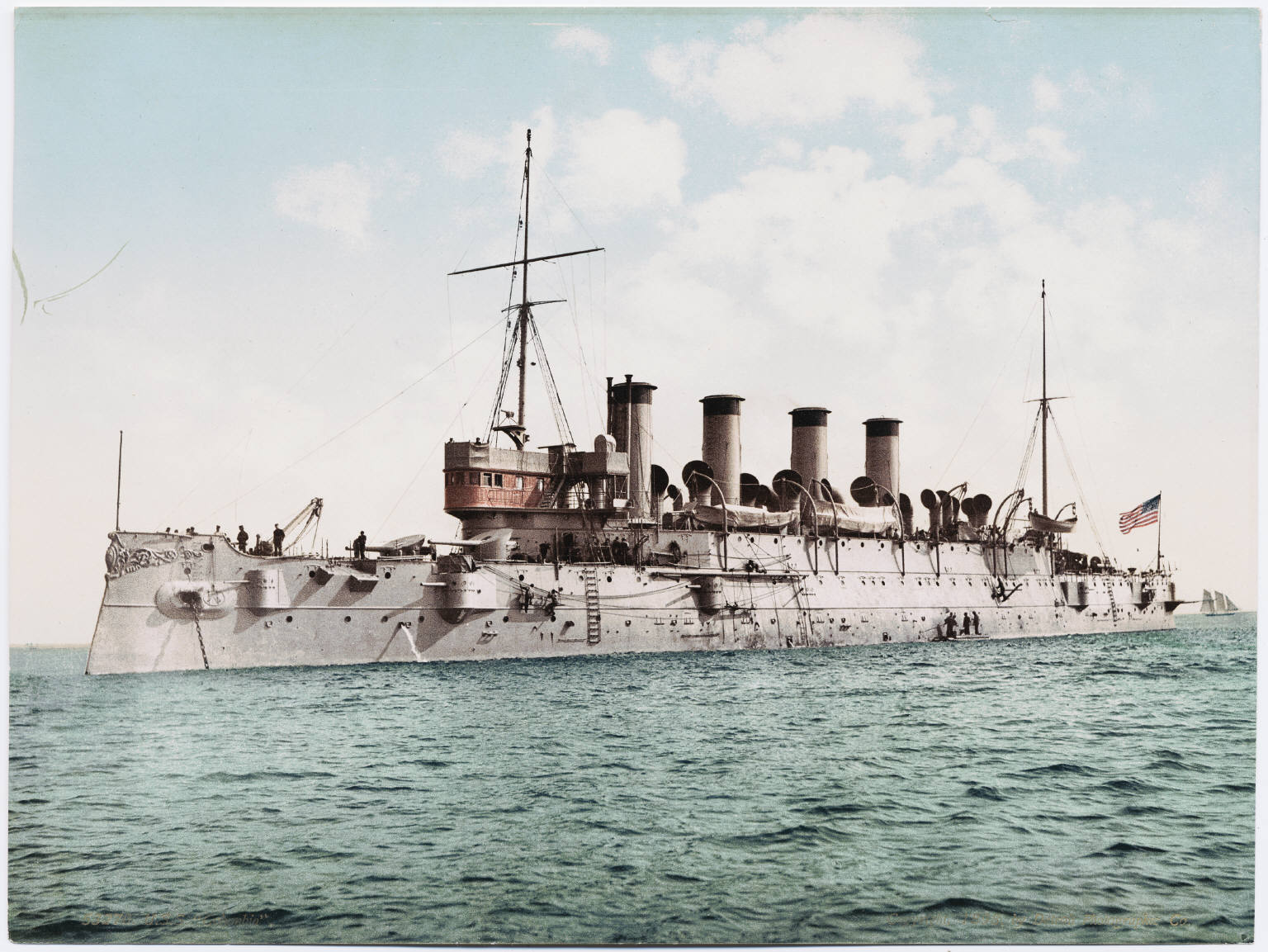
- USS Columbia (colorized photo)

Class overview
- Name: Columbia class
- Builders: William Cramp & Sons, PA
- Operators: United States Navy
- Preceded by: Cincinnati class
- Succeeded by: Denver class
- Cost: $2,725,000 (hull and machinery)
- Built: 1890–1894
- In commission: 1894–1921
- Planned: 2
- Completed: 2
- Scrapped: 2

General characteristics
- Type: Protected cruiser
- Displacement: 7,375 long tons (7,493 t)
- Length: 412 ft (126 m)
- Beam: 58 ft 2.25 in (17.74 m)
- Draft: 22 ft 6.5 in (6.87 m)
- Installed power: 8 or 10 × steam boilers; 3 × vertical triple expansion engines; 21,000 ihp (16,000 kW)
- Propulsion: 3 × screws
- Speed: 22.5 knots (41.7 km/h) (design)
- Range: 25,520 nmi (47,260 km; 29,370 mi) at 10 kn (19 km/h; 12 mph) (design)
- Complement: 30 Officers, 447 Enlisted
- Armament: As built: 1 × 8 in (203 mm)/40 caliber Mark 5 gun; 2 × 6 in (152 mm)/40 caliber guns; 8 × 4 in (102 mm)/40 caliber rapid fire (RF) guns; 12 × 6-pounder (57 mm (2.2 in)) RF guns; 4 × 1-pounder (37 mm (1.5 in)) RF guns; 4 × Gatling guns; One field piece (for landing parties); 4 × 14 in (356 mm) or 18 inch (450 mm) torpedo tubes
- Armor: Protective deck 4 in (102 mm) (slopes), 2.5 in (64 mm) (flats); Gun shields 4 in (102 mm); Gun sponsons 4 in (102 mm); Conning tower 5 in (127 mm)

General characteristics (1920)
- Armament: 3 × 6 in (150 mm)/45 caliber Mark 10 gun; 4 × 4 in (100 mm)/40 guns; 2 × 3 in (76 mm)/50 anti-aircraft guns; 4 × 3-pounder(47 mm (1.9 in)) saluting guns; 2 × 1-pounder (37 mm (1.5 in)) guns

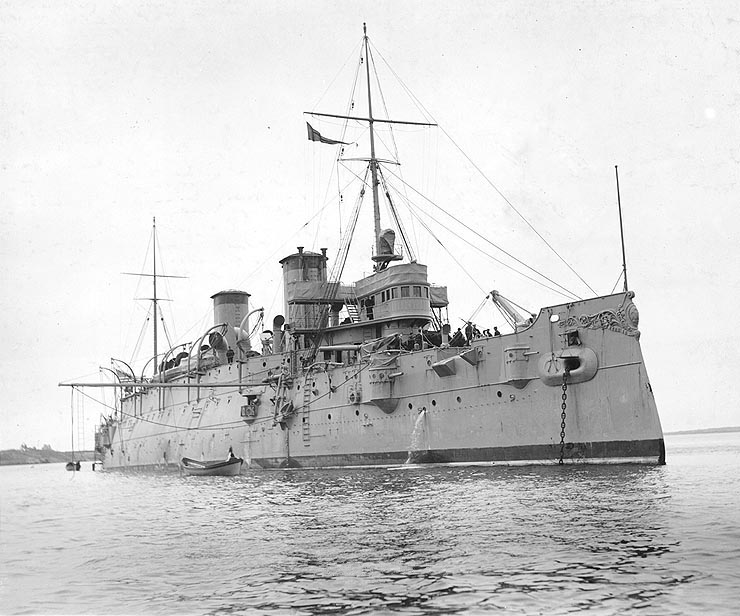
USS Minneapolis. Minneapolis had two funnels while Columbia had four.

The Columbia-class cruisers were two protected cruisers constructed in 1890 and 1891 and used by the United States Navy. They were lightly gunned ships with only moderate armor that were built for the speed needed to overtake and destroy the fast ocean liners of the day as commerce raiders. However, the light armament and armor left these ships over-specialized and outclassed by ordinary similar sized protected cruisers that they might encounter. Also, the engines were expensive to operate and at full power the ships' range was greatly decreased. Due to the ongoing size and speed race in ocean liners, by 1907 they were outclassed in speed by the ill-fated Lusitania and the German liner Kronprinzessin Cecilie.

Columbia was authorized by an Act of Congress approved 30 June 1890, and Minneapolis was authorized by an Act approved 2 March 1891.

== Design and construction ==
Due to their design, this type of ship was criticized as being not much better than an armed merchant cruiser. During the Spanish–American War, for example, Columbia was used as a troop transport, while both ships of the class were used as scouts.

=== Foreign equivalents ===
This type of large (but under-armed) specialized commerce raider was built by several other countries. The German cruiser SMS Kaiserin Augusta also had a triple-screw design and was nearly as long as the American Columbia-class ships, but had a more general role instead of a specialized commerce raider. The French copied the Columbia-class concept with two large protected cruisers; Guichen of 1897 and Châteaurenault of 1898 before switching to building only armored cruisers for the commerce-raiding role such as the Dupleix class of 1900. Later, Russia acquired a series of oversized protected cruisers such as the Pallada and Bogatyr classes along with Askold and Varyag up until the Russo-Japanese War (1905), although these were given a relatively stronger armament for their size. The British were the most probable target of most of these ships, and invested in various cruiser designs as a counter to the perceived threat.

=== Acquisition ===
US Representative Charles A. Boutelle of Maine was the primary advocate of these ships in Congress, and overcame significant opposition to get them built. William Cramp & Sons of Philadelphia was the sole bidder for Columbia, ordered in fiscal year 1891. Minneapolis was ordered the following year and described as the "most important ship" in that year's program. Bath Iron Works of Bath, Maine was the lowest bidder, but Bath could not build their own engines nor complete the ship in time. So the contract was awarded to Cramp, on condition that they lower their price $55,000 to meet Bath's bid.

=== Engineering ===
The engineering plant needed to meet the designed speed of 22.5 knots (41.7 km/h; 25.9 mph) was unprecedented in the US Navy. Engineer-in-Chief George W. Melville was personally involved in its design. The designed horsepower of 21,000 ihp (16,000 kW) was nearly double that of the battleship Iowa, and well in excess of the later Brooklyn's 16,000 ihp (12,000 kW). To achieve this a triple-screw powerplant, the first in the US Navy, was designed. Eight or ten (references vary, possibly 8 in Columbia and 10 in Minneapolis) coal-fired cylindrical boilers supplied steam to three triple-expansion engines. The ships could economically cruise at 15 knots (28 km/h; 17 mph) on the center engine alone. Both ships exceeded their design speed on trials; Columbia made 22.8 knots (42.2 km/h; 26.2 mph) and Minneapolis made 23.07 knots (42.73 km/h; 26.55 mph).

Consideration was also given to survivability in the event of battle damage. Each engine was in a separate compartment, and the center screw was 15 ft (4.6 m) aft of the outboard screws, minimizing the chance of more than one screw being disabled by a single hit. Columbia was built with four funnels while Minneapolis had two; it is possible this, along with the main gun placement on the aft deck, was intended to make the ships resemble their prey from a distance.

The normal coal allowance was 800 tons. However, the design allowance was 2,130 tons for a globe-girdling range of 25,520 nmi (47,260 km; 29,370 mi) at 10 kn (19 km/h; 12 mph). It seems this proved impractical, as the full load coal allowance is given in the same source as 1,576 tons.

In July 1895 Columbia made a transatlantic crossing from Southampton to Sandy Hook in 6 days, 23 hours, 49 minutes for an average speed of 18.41 knots. This was without forced draft and was said to be the fastest crossing for a warship to that date. However, the record holder at the time was an ocean liner, the German Hamburg America Line's Fürst Bismarck with a time of 6 days, 10 hours, 32 minutes.

=== Protection ===
The protection system included an armored deck as in other protected cruisers, 4 in (102 mm) on the sloped sides and 2.5 in (64 mm) in the flat middle. The gun shields were 4 in (102 mm), as were the sponsons for the 4-inch guns. The conning tower was 5 in (127 mm). Compared with other US protected cruisers, the armor was not inferior except in relation to the ships' size: the 7,000-ton Columbias had similar armor to 4,000-ton ships such as USS Baltimore.

=== Armament ===
The originally designed main armament for Columbia was four 6 in (152 mm)/40 caliber guns, two forward and two aft, but during construction the aft pair was replaced by a single 8 in (203 mm)/40 caliber Mark 5 gun. The two 6-inch guns were side by side just forward of the superstructure. Secondary armament included eight 4 in (102 mm)/40 caliber rapid fire (RF) guns in sponsons in the hull, 12 6-pounder (57 mm (2.2 in)) RF guns, four 1-pounder (37 mm (1.5 in)) RF guns, and four Gatling guns. A field artillery piece on a wheeled carriage was also carried for use by landing parties. The ships also had four torpedo tubes, 14 in (356 mm) on Columbia for Howell torpedoes and 18 inch (450 mm) on Minneapolis.

=== Refits ===
All torpedo tubes were removed by 1904. Both ships were out of commission for a long period, Columbia 1907–1915 and Minneapolis 1906–1917. During re-activation refits at the end of these periods the lone 8-inch gun was replaced by a third 6-inch (152 mm)/40 caliber gun. This was part of a general withdrawal from service of 8-inch Mark 5 guns due to a tendency to burst. Two 4-inch guns were also removed by 1917, leaving six guns. One source states that two additional 4-inch guns were removed and two 3-inch (76 mm)/50 caliber anti-aircraft guns were added circa 1918.

== Service ==
Both ships were commissioned in 1894 and were initially assigned to the North Atlantic Squadron. Columbia was involved in an intervention in Nicaragua July–August 1894. She cruised to Europe before being placed in reserve in May 1897. Minneapolis was in the European Squadron from 1895 to 1897 and was then placed in reserve in July 1897.

Both ships were re-activated with the outbreak of the Spanish–American War in March 1898, commencing the search for Admiral Cervera's squadron soon after. It was feared that Cervera's fleet would bombard the US East Coast. Columbia searched as far north as Maine, Minneapolis as far south as Venezuela. Neither appears to have encountered enemy ships during the war. Columbia carried troops to the invasion of Guánica, Puerto Rico on 25–26 July and supported the Puerto Rican Campaign through 14 August.

Minneapolis was placed in reserve in August 1898 as soon as hostilities ceased, Columbia following her in March 1899. Both recommissioned as receiving ships in 1902, Columbia soon joining the Atlantic Training Squadron until again decommissioning in 1907. Minneapolis joined a Special Service Squadron in 1905, making astronomical and other observations off Spain and Africa, including a solar eclipse on 30 August. She was present for the arrival of the body of John Paul Jones at the Naval Academy in Annapolis, Maryland in mid-1906. After some training cruises, she was decommissioned in late 1906.

Columbia was recommissioned in 1915 as flagship of the Submarine Flotilla. Following the American entry into World War I in April 1917, Minneapolis was recommissioned and both ships served as convoy escorts. In early 1919, with the war over, Columbia served in the Atlantic and Minneapolis served in the Pacific until both were decommissioned in 1921. Both were sold for scrap in 1921–22.

== Legacy ==
Minneapolis' mast and bell, the only surviving parts of her, are preserved on the northeastern shore of Lake Calhoun, near Lake Street in Minneapolis. The ship's wheel was also preserved, but was stolen.

== Ships in class ==
The two ships of the Columbia class were:

Ship	Shipyard	Laid down	Launched	Commissioned	Decommissioned	Fate
USS Columbia (C-12)	William Cramp & Sons, Philadelphia, Pennsylvania	30 December 1890	26 July 1892	23 April 1894	29 June 1921	Renamed Old Columbia 17 November 1921, sold for scrap 26 January 1922
USS Minneapolis (C-13)	William Cramp & Sons	16 December 1891	12 August 1893	13 December 1894	15 March 1921	Sold for scrap 5 August 1921

Columbia was renamed Old Columbia on 17 November 1921 to avoid confusion with the auxiliary ship USS Columbia (AG-9). On 17 July 1920 these ships were redesignated with the new hull numbers CA-16 (heavy cruiser) and CA-17.

== See also ==
- List of cruisers of the United States Navy

== Bibliography ==
- Bauer, K. Jack; Roberts, Stephen S. (1991). Register of Ships of the U.S. Navy, 1775–1990: Major Combatants. Westport, Connecticut: Greenwood Press. ISBN 0-313-26202-0.
- Burr, Lawrence (2011). US Cruisers 1883-1904: The Birth of the Steel Navy. Osprey Publishing. ISBN 9781780962702.
- Friedman, Norman (1984). U.S. Cruisers: An Illustrated Design History. Annapolis, Maryland: Naval Institute Press. ISBN 0-87021-718-6.
- Gardiner, Robert; Chesneau, Roger (1979). Conway's All the World's Fighting Ships 1860–1905. New York: Mayflower Books. ISBN 0-8317-0302-4.
