= French cruiser Dupleix (1900) =

French lead ship of Dupleix-class

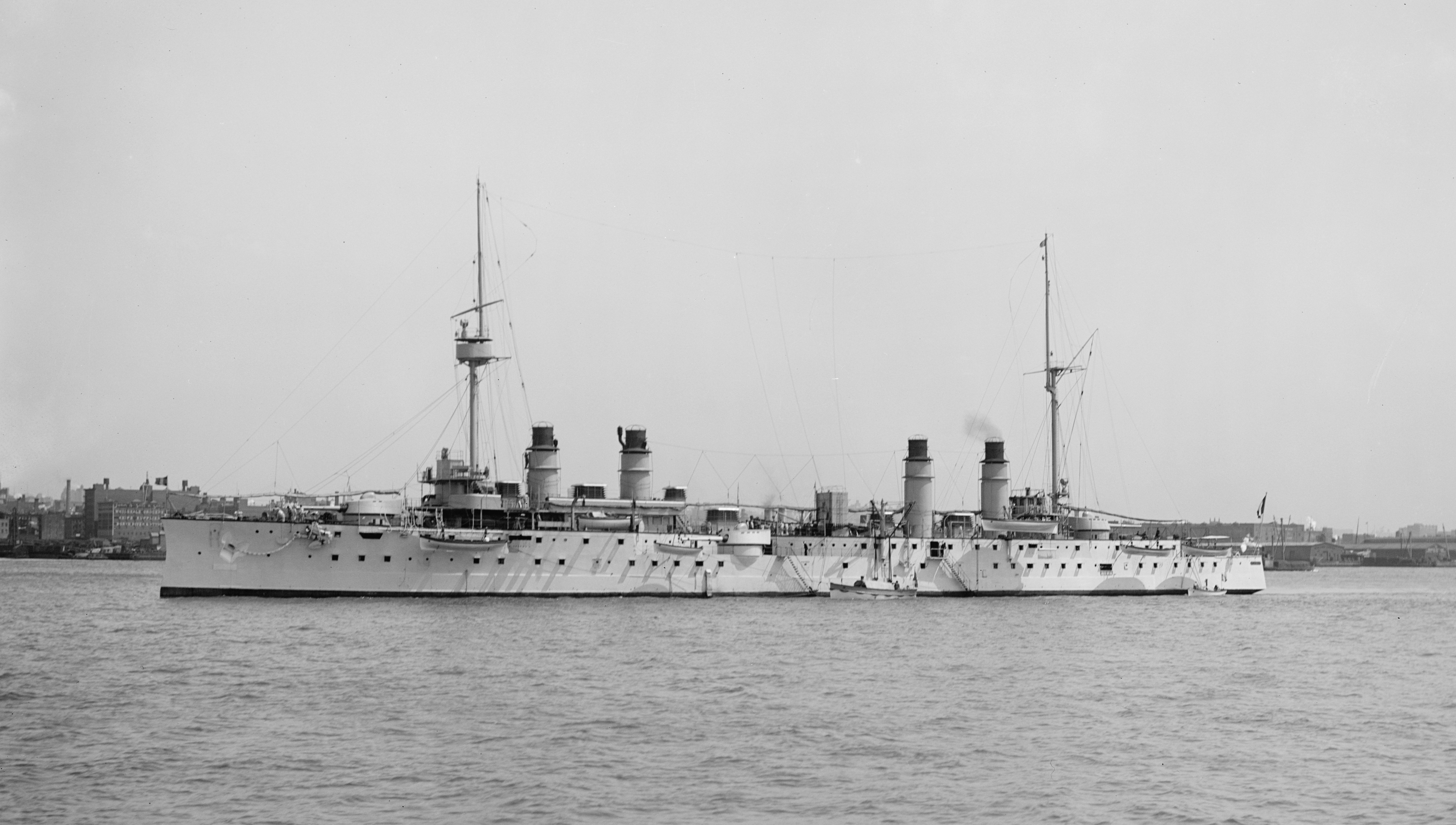
- Sister ship Kléber at anchor at the Jamestown Exposition, June 1907

History

France
- Name: Dupleix
- Namesake: Joseph François Dupleix
- Ordered: 18 December 1897
- Builder: Arsenal de Rochefort
- Cost: FF16,308,850
- Laid down: 18 January 1899
- Launched: 28 April 1900
- Commissioned: 15 September 1903
- Decommissioned: 1 May 1919
- Stricken: 27 September 1919
- Fate: Sold for scrap, 1922

General characteristics
- Class & type: Dupleix-class cruiser
- Displacement: 7,700 t (7,578 long tons)
- Length: 132.1 m (433 ft 5 in) (o/a)
- Beam: 17.8 m (58 ft 5 in)
- Draft: 7.46 m (24 ft 6 in)
- Installed power: 24 Belleville boilers; 17,100 PS (12,600 kW)
- Propulsion: 3 shafts; 3 triple-expansion steam engines
- Speed: 20.9 knots (38.7 km/h; 24.1 mph)
- Range: 6,450 nmi (11,950 km; 7,420 mi) at 10 knots (19 km/h; 12 mph)
- Complement: 569; 607 as flagship
- Armament: 4 × twin 164.7 mm (6.5 in) guns; 4 × single 100 mm (3.9 in) guns; 10 × single 47 mm (1.9 in) guns; 4 × single 37 mm (1.5 in) guns; 2 × 450 mm (17.7 in) torpedo tubes
- Armor: Waterline belt: 84–102 mm (3.3–4.0 in); Deck: 42–70 mm (1.7–2.8 in); Gun turrets: 110 mm (4.3 in); Barbettes: 120 mm (4.7 in); Conning tower: 100–120 mm (3.9–4.7 in)

The French cruiser Dupleix was the lead ship of her class of three armored cruisers built for the French Navy in the first decade of the 20th century. Designed for overseas service and armed with eight 164.7-millimeter (6.5 in) guns, the ships were smaller and less powerfully armed than their predecessors. Completed in 1903, Dupleix was initially assigned to the Atlantic Division (Division de l'Atlantique) as its flagship. The ship spent 1906 to 1909 in reserve before she was sent to the Far East in 1910, again serving as a flagship.

When World War I began in August 1914, the cruiser was still in the Far East. Before she was transferred to the Eastern Mediterranean in May 1915, Dupleix spent most of her time on escort duty in the Indian Ocean and Red Sea. Over the next year, she was tasked to blockade the Aegean coast of Ottoman Turkey. To help protect Allied shipping from German commerce raiders, the ship was transferred to French West Africa in mid-1916 and remained there until October 1917 when she returned to France to be placed in reserve. Dupleix was decommissioned in 1919 and was sold for scrap in 1922.

== Design and description ==
The Dupleix-class ships were much smaller and more lightly armed than the preceding Jeanne d'Arc. They measured 132.1 meters (433 ft 5 in) long overall with a beam of 17.8 meters (58 ft 5 in) and had a maximum draft of 7.46 meters (24 ft 6 in). The cruisers displaced 7,700 metric tons (7,578 long tons) as designed. They normally had a crew of 19 officers and 550 enlisted men, but accommodated 24 officers and 583 enlisted men when serving as a flagship.

The sister ships' propulsion machinery consisted of three vertical triple-expansion steam engines, each driving a single propeller shaft, using steam provided by water-tube boilers, but the types of machinery differed between them. Dupleix had four-cylinder engines fed by 24 Belleville boilers with a working of pressure of 20 kg/cm^{2} (1,961 kPa; 284 psi). The engines of all three ships were designed to produce a total of 17,100 metric horsepower (12,600 kW) that was intended to give them a maximum speed of 21 knots (39 km/h; 24 mph). Despite exceeding her horsepower rating, Dupleix failed to reach her designed speed during her sea trials on 13 Sep 1902, the ship only made 20.9 knots (38.7 km/h; 24.1 mph) from 17,870 metric horsepower (13,140 kW). The sisters carried up to 1,200 metric tons (1,200 long tons; 1,300 short tons) of coal and could steam for 6,450 nautical miles (11,950 km; 7,420 mi) at a speed of 10 knots (19 km/h; 12 mph).

=== Armament and protection ===
The ships of the Dupleix class had a main armament that consisted of eight quick-firing (QF) Canon de 164.7 mm Modèle 1893–1896 guns. They were mounted in four twin gun turrets, one each fore and aft of the superstructure and a pair of wing turrets amidships. The cruisers' secondary armament consisted of four QF Canon de 100 mm (3.9 in) Modèle de 1893 guns on single mounts in unprotected casemates in the hull. For defense against torpedo boats, they carried ten 47-millimeter (1.9 in) and four 37-millimeter (1.5 in) Hotchkiss guns, all of which were on single mounts. The ship were also equipped with two above-water 450-millimeter (17.7 in) torpedo tubes, one on each broadside.

The nickel steel armor belt of the Dupleix-class cruisers covered the entire waterline length of the ship except for 18.9 meters (62 ft) of the stern. The belt armor was 102 millimeters (4 in) thick, although it reduced to 84 millimeters (3.3 in) in front of the forward turret. The curved protective deck had a total thickness of 42 millimeters (1.7 in) on the flat and 70 millimeters (2.8 in) on the upper part of the curved portion where it met the bottom edge of the belt armor. The face and sides of the gun turrets were protected by 110-millimeter (4.3 in) Harvey face-hardened armor plates. The armor protection of the gun barbettes was 120 millimeters (4.7 in) thick. The sides of the elliptical conning tower were 100 to 120 millimeters thick.

== Construction and career ==
Dupleix, named after Joseph François Dupleix, the Governor-General of French India (Établissements français dans l'Inde) was ordered from the Arsenal de Rochefort on 18 December 1897. The ship was laid down on 18 January 1899, launched on 28 April 1900, and began her formal sea trials on 15 March 1903. During her preliminary trials in 1902 there was a boiler accident on 22 August in which seven stokers were badly burnt. One of the ship's high-pressure engine cylinders cracked during a 24-hour trial on 30 September; repairs and further testing delayed the ship's trials by eight months. Dupleix was finally commissioned on 15 September 1903. She cost 16,308,850 francs.

Upon completion the ship became flagship of the Atlantic Division, visiting the Azores, West Africa and the Americas before she was reduced to reserve in 1906. Four years later she was reactivated and assigned to the Far Eastern Division (Division navale de l'Extrême Orient) as its flagship. Departing Cherbourg, France, on 12 November 1910, she was based in Saigon, French Indochina, until August 1914. Her role as the division flagship was assumed by the armored cruiser Montcalm upon that ship's arrival in Saigon in 1913.

=== World War I ===
As tensions rose during the July Crisis of 1914, Dupleix departed Japan on 29 July and arrived in British Hong Kong on 5 August where she joined the British China Squadron in accordance with pre-war plans. The following day she joined the British pre-dreadnought battleship HMS Triumph as she steamed north to begin the blockade of the German-leased port of Qingdao. She developed engine problems which prevented her from joining the search for the German light cruiser SMS Emden once the Imperial Japanese Navy assumed responsibility for the blockade on 9 September. Later that month, Dupleix was transferred to Penang in the British Straits Settlements to reinforce the French destroyers patrolling the Strait of Malacca and to have her engines repaired. By late September, the cruiser began escorting convoys through the Indian Ocean and the Red Sea, most notably the Wessex Territorials from Egypt to India in late October.

Dupleix was transferred to the newly formed Dardanelles Squadron (Escadre des Dardanelles) in May 1915, which was tasked to blockade the Aegean coast of Turkey. On the 26th, the cruiser was attacked by Ottoman coastal artillery at Bodrum while inspecting shipping, losing 27 men killed and 11 wounded. The successes of German merchant raiders like Möwe in 1916 caused the Allies to transfer cruisers to the Atlantic to protect their shipping. Dupleix was assigned to a newly-formed 6th Light Division (6^{e} Division légère (DL)), which consisted of all three sisters, in July 1916 and was based in Dakar, French West Africa.

To release manpower for higher-priority patrol boats, the 6th DL was reduced to Dupleix and Desaix and renamed the Coast of Africa Division (Division navale de la côte d'Afrique) on 18 May 1917; Contre-amiral (Rear Admiral) Louis Jaurès transferred his flag to Dupleix. The division was disbanded on 14 September and the cruiser sailed to Brest, to be placed in reserve on 15 October. She was decommissioned on 1 May 1919 and stricken on 27 September from the Navy List. In 1920 Dupleix was towed to Landévennec and she was sold for scrap in 1922.
