= Jean-Joseph Brisson =

French naval officer

- Born: May 5, 1868; Cabara
- Died: July 25, 1957 (aged 89); Bordeaux
- Military career
- Allegiance: France
- Branch: Navy
- Service years: 1888–1930
- Rank: Vice admiral
- Commands: Guichen
- Conflicts: First World War
- Awards: Grand Officer of the Legion of Honour

Jean-Joseph Brisson (French pronunciation: [ʒɑ̃ ʒozɛf bʁisɔ̃]; 5 May 1868 – 25 July 1957) was a French naval officer who served in the First World War.

Born at Cabara in Gironde, Brisson entered the École Navale in 1886 and the École d'application des enseignes de vaisseau in 1888. He was named a midshipman first class in 1889 and promoted to ensign in 1894. He served for a time in the colony of Dahomey. Afterwards he became a professor of ballistics at the École de canonnage and then professor of artillery at the École supérieure de la Marine. In 1912–13, he was second-in-command of the École d'application.

Appointed frigate captain, Brisson took command of the cruiser Guichen. In this capacity, in 1915, he bombarded Ottoman forces near Musa Dagh and helped rescue 5,000 Armenians from genocide, conducting them to Port Said. In 1917, he was promoted head of the fourth section of the naval staff. In 1919, commanding the French naval forces in the Baltic Sea, he gave assistance to Latvia at the Battle of Riga.

Promoted to rear admiral after the war, Brisson took command of the 3rd Line Division in the Mediterranean. Between 1923 and 1928, he was major-general of the 5th Maritime Region. In 1928, he was promoted to vice admiral and named president of the navy's technical committee. On 5 May 1930, he was put on the reserve list of the second section of the naval staff. In retirement, he moved to Bordeaux. Among the honours he received from the French state, he was appointed a Grand Officer of the Legion of Honour and was granted the Croix de guerre des théâtres d'opérations extérieures with palm leaves. He received numerous foreign honours as well.
