= SS Pfalz (1913) =

German cargo steamship, operational from 1913 to her wreckage in 1937

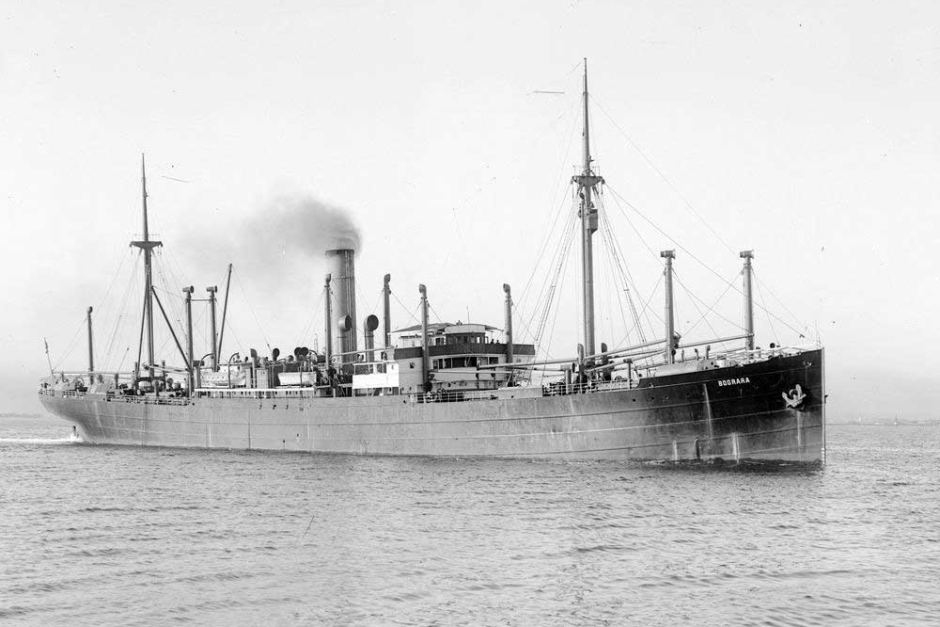
- The ship operating as HMT Boorara during the First World War

History

German Empire; Australia; Greece
- Name: Pfalz
- Operator: Norddeutscher Lloyd
- Port of registry: Bremen (until 1914); Syra (after 1926)
- Route: Bremerhaven – Cape Town – Australia (for NDL)
- Builder: Bremer Vulkan
- Yard number: 570
- Launched: 8 November 1913
- Completed: 19 December 1913
- Renamed: HMT Boorara in 1914; SS Nereus in 1926
- Identification: Code Letters JGKW; (from 1926)
- Fate: Wrecked 1937

General characteristics
- Class & type: Rheinland-class cargo ship
- Tonnage: 6,557 GRT
- Length: 472.6 ft (144.0 m)
- Beam: 59.2 ft (18.0 m)
- Draught: 36.8 ft (11.2 m)
- Installed power: 470 NHP
- Propulsion: triple expansion steam engine built by North East Marine Engineering Co, Newcastle-upon-Tyne; single screw
- Speed: 12.5 knots (23.2 km/h)

Pfalz was a 6,557-ton cargo steamer operated by German shipping company Norddeutscher Lloyd. The ship became the target of the first shot fired by Australian forces in World War I, soon after departing the Port of Melbourne in Australia.

== Norddeutscher Lloyd service ==
The ship departed Victoria Dock in Melbourne on 5 August 1914, with Williamstown-based pilot Captain Montgomery Robinson aboard. As the ship passed Portsea it was momentarily stopped by the SS Alvina but allowed to proceed.

Just before the ship approached Port Phillip heads, the Royal Australian Garrison Artillery stationed at Fort Nepean was informed of the declaration of war with Germany and received an order to "stop her or sink her". Signals were hoisted, commanding the ship to halt. As the warning had no effect, a shot was fired across the bow of the ship from one of the fort's 6-inch Mk VII guns. This was the first British Empire shot of the war.

The pilot convinced the ship's master that a second round would likely be directed at the ship itself, and the ship was turned around. The ship was taken back to Portsea where the crew was placed under arrest.

== Australian naval service ==
The ship was subsequently requisitioned by the Royal Australian Navy and refitted as a troopship at Williamstown. She was renamed HMT Boorara. Soon after, she took part in the second Australian convoy to the Mediterranean, with subsequent duties including the transportation of Ottoman prisoners from the Dardanelles Campaign.

While serving in the Aegean Sea in July 1915, Boorara collided with the armoured cruiser Kléber and was beached at Moudros. Boorara was subsequently taken to Naples to be repaired.

In 1916, the HMT Boorara was used to transport Australian soldiers from Brisbane, Australia to Plymouth, U.K.

Later in the war, the ship was torpedoed twice in the English Channel. The first time, on 20 March 1918, she was struck near Beachy Head and was towed to Newcastle for extensive repairs. The second time she was struck near Whitby on 23 July 1918 when the ship was leaving port after being repaired. The ship was torpedoed in the exact same area as the previous damage to the ship

In 1919, The HMT Boorara was used to repatriate Australian troops. The ship caught fire at Dunkirk and was repaired at Antwerp.

== Postwar civilian service ==
After the war, the ship was used by the Commonwealth Line for the transport of frozen cargo to the United Kingdom, using ports at Avonmouth, Liverpool and Glasgow.

In 1926, the E. Hadjilias shipping line of Athens in Greece bought her, renamed her Nereus and registered her on the Cycladean island of Syra in the Aegean Sea.

== Loss ==
In August 1937, Nereus sailed in ballast from Moji in Japan for Port Alberni to load a cargo of lumber for the United Kingdom under charter to the Anglo-Canadian Shipping Co. On 8 August, in heavy fog, she ran aground on rocks about 1,000 feet (300 m) south-east of Cape Beale on Vancouver Island. The salvage steamer SS Salvage King from Victoria rescued her crew. Within 48 hours of grounding, Nereus broke her back and was lost.
