= French cruiser Kléber =

Dupleix-class armoured cruiser

Coordinates: 48°17′13″N 4°50′50″W

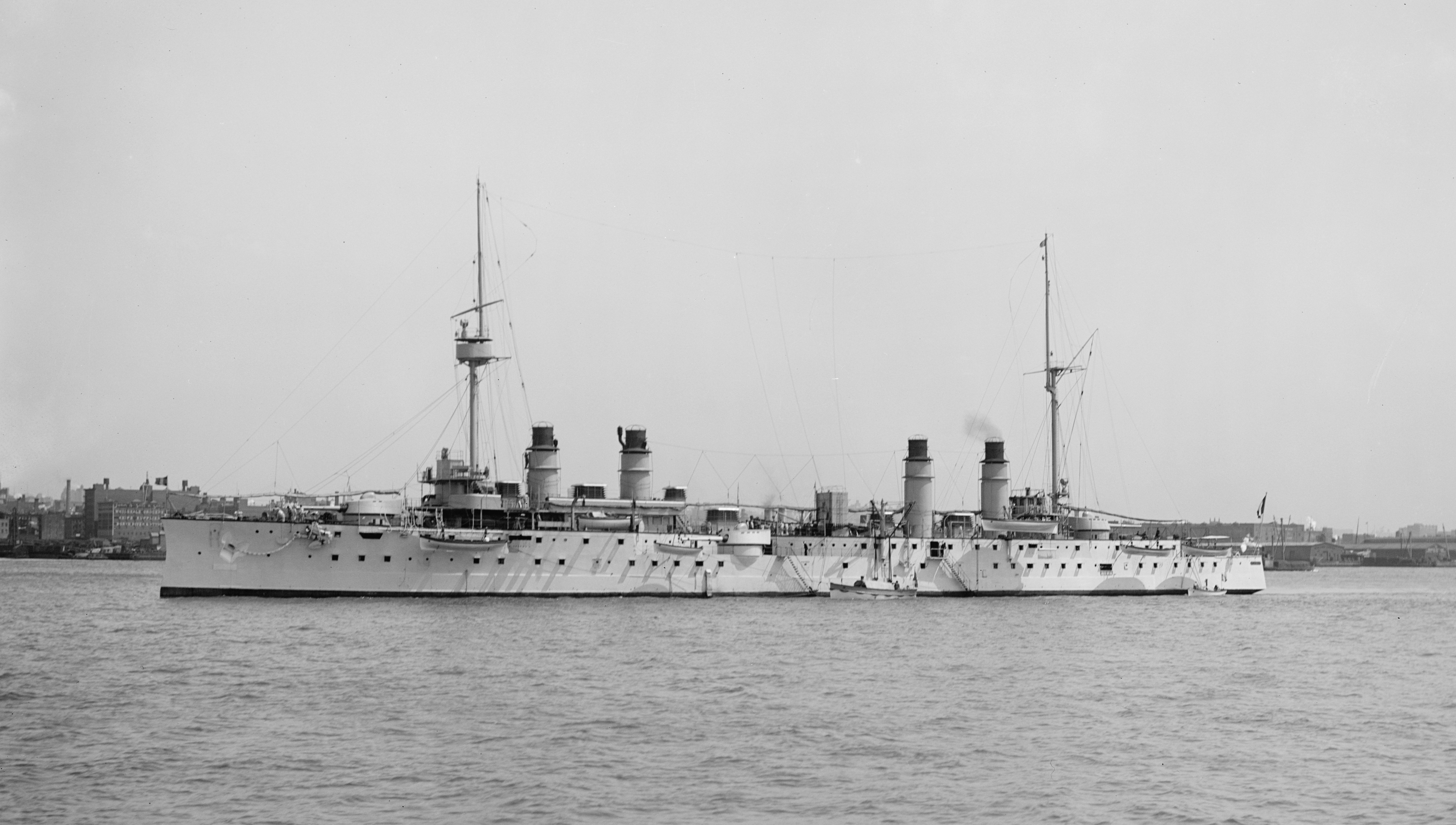
- Kléber at anchor at the Jamestown Exposition, June 1907

History

France
- Name: Kléber
- Namesake: General Jean-Baptiste Kléber
- Ordered: 28 December 1897
- Builder: Forges et Chantiers de la Gironde, Lormont
- Laid down: Early 1899
- Launched: 20 September 1902
- Commissioned: 4 July 1904
- Fate: Sunk, 27 June 1917

General characteristics
- Class & type: Dupleix-class armored cruiser
- Displacement: 7,700 t (7,578 long tons)
- Length: 132.1 m (433 ft 5 in) (o/a)
- Beam: 17.8 m (58 ft 5 in)
- Draft: 7.46 m (24 ft 6 in)
- Installed power: 20 Niclausse boilers; 17,100 PS (12,600 kW)
- Propulsion: 3 shafts; 3 triple-expansion steam engines
- Speed: 21 knots (39 km/h; 24 mph)
- Range: 6,450 nmi (11,950 km; 7,420 mi) at 10 knots (19 km/h; 12 mph)
- Complement: 569; 607 as flagship
- Armament: 4 × twin 164.7 mm (6.5 in) guns; 4 × single 100 mm (3.9 in) guns; 10 × single 47 mm (1.9 in) guns; 4 × single 37 mm (1.5 in) guns; 2 × 450 mm (17.7 in) torpedo tubes
- Armor: Waterline belt: 84–102 mm (3.3–4.0 in); Deck: 42–70 mm (1.7–2.8 in); Gun turrets: 110 mm (4.3 in); Barbettes: 120 mm (4.7 in); Conning tower: 100–120 mm (3.9–4.7 in)

Kléber was one of three Dupleix-class armored cruisers built for the French Navy (Marine Nationale) in the first decade of the 20th century. Designed for overseas service and armed with eight 164.7-millimeter (6.5 in) guns, the ships were smaller and less powerfully armed than their predecessors. Completed in 1904, Kléber was initially assigned to the Mediterranean Squadron (Escadre de la Méditerranée) before she was transferred to the Atlantic Division (Division de l'Atlantique) three years later, where she often served as a flagship. The ship was reduced to reserve in 1909–1910 before she was sent to the Far East in 1911. Kléber returned to France two years later and was again placed in reserve.

As tensions rose shortly before the beginning of World War I in August 1914, the ship was reactivated. When the war began she was assigned to defend Allied shipping in the English Channel and intercept German ships attempting to pass through. Transferred back to the Mediterranean in 1915, Kléber played a minor role on the periphery of the Gallipoli Campaign until a resurgence in German commerce raiding caused the Allies to transfer more cruisers to the Atlantic to protect their shipping in mid-1916. The ship was deemed surplus to requirements the following year; on her way back to France to decommission, Kléber struck a naval mine on 27 June and sank with the loss of 38 crewmen.

== Design and description ==
The Dupleix-class ships were much smaller and more lightly armed than the preceding Jeanne d'Arc. They measured 132.1 meters (433 ft 5 in) long overall with a beam of 17.8 meters (58 ft 5 in) and had a maximum draft of 7.46 meters (24 ft 6 in). The cruisers displaced 7,700 metric tons (7,578 long tons) as designed. They normally had a crew of 19 officers and 550 enlisted men, but accommodated 24 officers and 583 enlisted men when serving as a flagship.

The sister ships' propulsion machinery consisted of three vertical triple-expansion steam engines, each driving a single propeller shaft, using steam provided by water-tube boilers, but the types of machinery differed between them. Kléber had three-cylinder engines that used 20 Niclausse boilers at a working pressure 18 kg/cm^{2} (1,765 kPa; 256 psi). The engines of all three ships were designed to produce a total of 17,100 metric horsepower (12,600 kW) that was intended to give them a maximum speed of 21 knots (39 km/h; 24 mph). Only Kléber exceeded their designed speed during her sea trials on 14 October 1903, attaining 21.5 knots (39.8 km/h; 24.7 mph) from 17,177 metric horsepower (12,634 kW). The sisters carried up to 1,200 metric tons (1,200 long tons; 1,300 short tons) of coal and could steam for 6,450 nautical miles (11,950 km; 7,420 mi) at a speed of 10 knots (19 km/h; 12 mph).

=== Armament and protection ===
The ships of the Dupleix class had a main armament that consisted of eight quick-firing (QF) Canon de 164.7 mm Modèle 1893–1896 guns. They were mounted in four twin gun turrets, one each fore and aft of the superstructure and a pair of wing turrets amidships. The cruisers' secondary armament consisted of four QF Canon de 100 mm (3.9 in) Modèle de 1893 guns on single mounts in unprotected casemates in the hull. For defense against torpedo boats, they carried ten 47-millimeter (1.9 in) and four 37-millimeter (1.5 in) Hotchkiss guns, all of which were on single mounts. The ship were also equipped with two above-water 450-millimeter (17.7 in) torpedo tubes, one on each broadside.

The nickel steel armor belt of the Dupleix-class cruisers covered the entire waterline length of the ship except for 18.9 meters (62 ft) of the stern. The belt armor was 102 millimeters (4 in) thick, although it reduced to 84 millimeters (3.3 in) in front of the forward turret. The curved protective deck had a total thickness of 42 millimeters (1.7 in) on the flat and 70 millimeters (2.8 in) on the upper part of the curved portion where it met the bottom edge of the belt armor. The face and sides of the gun turrets were protected by 110-millimeter (4.3 in) Harvey face-hardened armor plates. The armor protection of the gun barbettes was 120 millimeters (4.7 in) thick. The sides of the elliptical conning tower were 100 to 120 millimeters thick.

== Service history ==
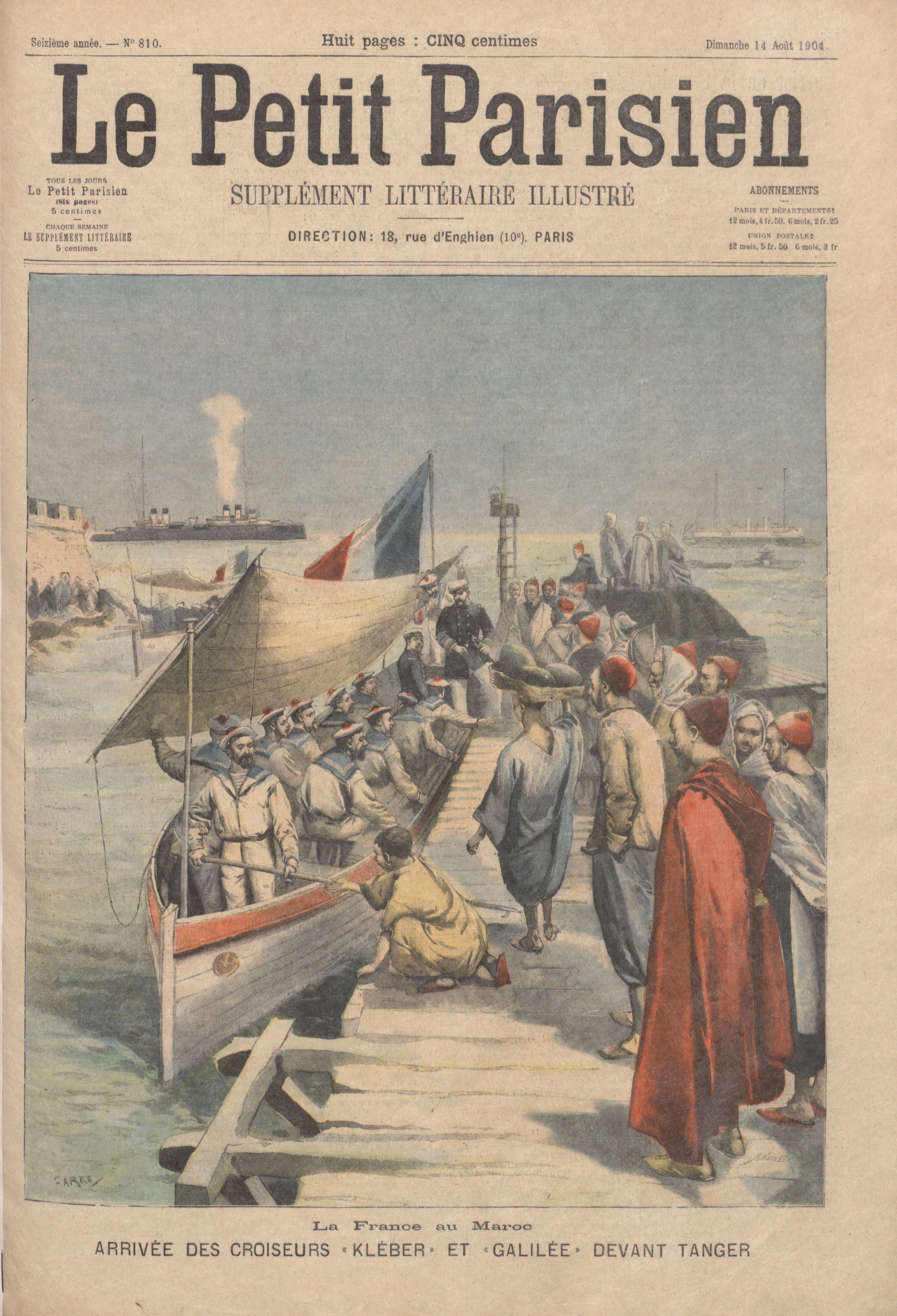
Kléber and the protected cruiser Galilée at Tangier illustrated in Le Petit Parisien in 1904

Named after the French Revolutionary-era General Jean-Baptiste Kléber, the ship was ordered from Forges et Chantiers de la Gironde on 28 December 1897. Construction was considerably delayed when the armament configuration was revised after the ship had already been laid down; the contract for Kléber was revised to account for the changes on 22 August 1899. Kléber was laid down at their shipyard in Lormont in early 1899 and launched on 20 September 1902. When the ship was launched she struck the river bottom because the height of the tide had been misjudged. Despite the damage, the ship began her formal sea trials on 26 September. Repairs and trials took two years and she was finally commissioned on 4 July 1904. The ship cost 19,258,000 francs. Kléber was assigned to the Mediterranean Fleet's Light Squadron (Escadre légère) upon completion, together with her sister Desaix. The latter ship was transferred away in September 1905, but rejoined the squadron in November 1906, replacing Kléber which was transferred to the Atlantic where she became the flagship of the Antilles Division (Division des Antilles). During a visit to the United States, the ship accidentally rammed an American cargo ship, the 2,183-gross register ton (GRT) iron-hulled screw steamer Hugoma, on the Mississippi River off New Orleans, Louisiana, on 20 February 1907. Hugoma subsequently sank in 100 feet (30 m) of water. There were 25 people on board the freighter, and sources disagree as to whether all of them survived or seven crewmen died. By 20 May Kléber was visiting New York City, together with the armored cruiser Victor Hugo and the protected cruiser Chasseloup-Laubat. The trio sailed to Jamestown, Virginia, on 31 May where they participated in the Jamestown Exposition and in the naval review presided over by President Theodore Roosevelt on 10 June.

In January 1908 Kléber became flagship of the Moroccan Division (Division du Maroc) and was placed in reserve the following year. In 1911 the ship was assigned to the Far East Naval Division (Division navale de l'Extrême-Orient), joining her sister Dupleix. Kléber struck an uncharted reef on 12 July 1912 and received temporary repairs at Kobe, Japan, before returning to Lorient, France, in January 1913 where she returned to reserve.

=== World War I ===
As tensions rose during the July Crisis of 1914, Kléber, Desaix and the other cruisers in reserve were reactivated. The sisters were assigned to the 3rd Light Division (3^{e} Division légère (DL)) of the 2nd Light Squadron (Escadre 2^{e} légère) which was tasked to defend the English Channel in conjunction with the British. The 3rd DL was on station in the western end of the Channel by 4 August, where their mission was to intercept German shipping and provide distant cover for the smaller ships escorting the transports conveying the British Expeditionary Force to France. In early September, Kléber and the armored cruisers Gloire and Gueydon established a new patrol line further south off the southern coast of Brittany.

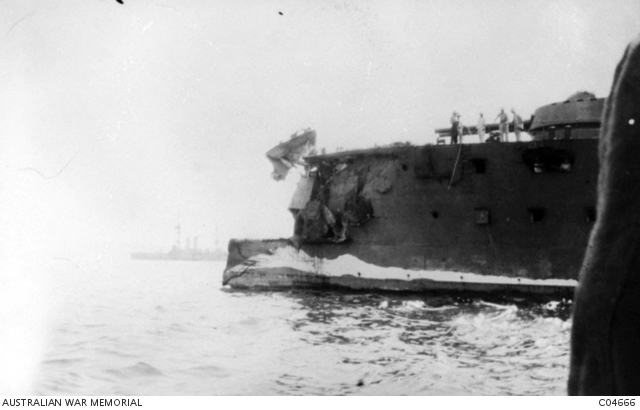
Kléber's damaged bow after the collision

Improved defenses in the Channel and the stabilization of the front in early 1915 allowed the cruisers to be released from their tasks, so Kléber was transferred to the Dardanelles to support Allied forces in the Gallipoli Campaign in May. She was assigned to the Dardanelles Squadron (Escadre des Dardanelles) when that unit was formed on 16 May. The ship briefly ran aground off Scala Nuova Bay and was engaged by coastal artillery without effect before she could free herself. Kléber, Dupleix, and the armored cruisers Bruix and Latouche-Tréville were now assigned to blockade the coast of Asia Minor, based out of Lesbos. Kléber collided with the Royal Australian Navy troopship HMT Boorara in the Aegean Sea on 17 July 1915, forcing Boorara to beach herself on Mudros and damaging the cruiser's bow.

After the Kingdom of Bulgaria joined the Central Powers in mid-October, Kléber, the Russian protected cruiser Askold and four destroyers was tasked to raid the Aegean coast of Bulgaria between Dedeagatch and Porto Lago while other forces bombarded the former town and its nearby railroad junction on 21 October. The successes of merchant raiders like Möwe in 1916 caused the Allies to transfer cruisers to the Atlantic to protect their shipping. Kléber became the flagship of a new 6th DL, which consisted of all three sisters, in July 1916, based in Dakar, French West Africa.

To release manpower for higher-priority patrol boats, the 6th DL was reduced to two ships and renamed the Coast of Africa Division (Division navale de la côte d'Afrique) on 18 May 1917; Contre-amiral (Rear Admiral) Louis Jaurès transferred his flag to Dupleix. En route to Brest, France, Kléber struck a mine at 06:00 on 27 June that the German U-boat UC-61 had laid off the Iroise entrance to Brest. The mine exploded abreast the forward boiler rooms, knocking them and the forward auxiliary machine room offline. The aft boilers were only operable for 20 more minutes before bulkheads began to give way at 06:30 and abandon ship was ordered. Nearby fishing trawlers, a French torpedo boat and a British steamship were able to rescue all but 38 of her crew.

== Bibliography ==
- Chesneau, Roger & Kolesnik, Eugene M., eds. (1979). Conway's All the World's Fighting Ships 1860–1905. Greenwich, UK: Conway Maritime Press. ISBN 0-8317-0302-4.
- Corbett, Julian (1997) [1940]. Naval Operations. History of the Great War: Based on Official Documents. Vol. III (2nd ed.). London; Nashville, Tennessee: Imperial War Museum in association with the Battery Press. ISBN 1-870423-50-X.
- Jordan, John & Caresse, Philippe (2019). French Armoured Cruisers 1887–1932. Barnsley, UK: Seaforth Publishing. ISBN 978-1-5267-4118-9.
- Sieche, Erwin F. (1990). "Austria-Hungary's Last Visit to the USA". Warship International. XXVII (2): 142–164. ISSN 0043-0374.
- Silverstone, Paul H. (1984). Directory of the World's Capital Ships. New York: Hippocrene Books. ISBN 0-88254-979-0.
