= USS Minneapolis (C-13) =

Columbia-class cruiser

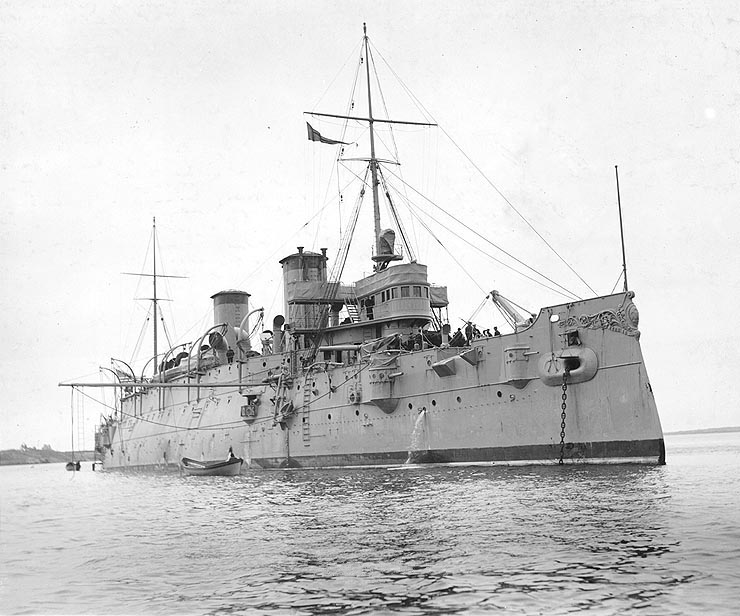
- USS Minneapolis (C-13), photographed while at anchor, 1898.

History

United States
- Name: Minneapolis
- Namesake: City of Minneapolis, Minnesota
- Ordered: 2 March 1891
- Awarded: 31 August 1891
- Builder: William Cramp & Sons, Philadelphia
- Cost: $2,690,000 (contract price of hull and machinery)
- Yard number: 273
- Laid down: 16 December 1891
- Launched: 12 August 1893
- Sponsored by: Miss Elizabeth Washburn
- Commissioned: 13 December 1894
- Decommissioned: 15 March 1921
- Reclassified: CA-17, 17 July 1920
- Stricken: 26 January 1922
- Identification: Hull symbol:C-13; Hull symbol:CA-17
- Fate: Sold for scrap, 5 August 1921

General characteristics (as built)
- Class & type: Columbia class protected cruiser
- Displacement: 7,350 long tons (7,468 t) (standard); 8,270 long tons (8,403 t) (full load)
- Length: 413 ft 1 in (125.91 m) oa; 411 ft 7 in (125.45 m)pp
- Beam: 58 ft 2 in (17.73 m)
- Draft: 22 ft 7 in (6.88 m)
- Installed power: 8 × Double-ended boilers, 2 × Single-ended boilers; 21,000 ihp (16,000 kW)
- Propulsion: 3 × vertical triple expansion reciprocating engines; 2 × screws
- Speed: 21 knots (39 km/h; 24 mph); 23.07 knots (42.73 km/h; 26.55 mph) (Speed on Trial)
- Complement: 45 officers 338 enlisted men
- Armament: 1 × 8 in (200 mm)/40 caliber Mark 5 gun; 2 × 6 in (150 mm)/40 guns; 8 × 4 in (100 mm)/40 guns; 12 × 6-pounder (57 mm (2.2 in)) guns saluting guns; 4 × 1-pounder (37 mm (1.5 in)) guns; 4 × gatling guns; 4 × 14 in (356 mm) torpedo tubes
- Armor: Deck: 4 in (100 mm) (slope); 2 1/2 in (64 mm) (flat); Conning Tower: 5 in (130 mm); Shields: 4 in (100 mm)

General characteristics (1914)
- Armament: 3 × 6 in (150 mm)/45 caliber Mark 10 gun; 8 × 4 in (102 mm)/40 guns; 2 × 6-pounder (57 mm (2.2 in)) saluting guns

General characteristics (1920)
- Armament: 3 × 6 in (150 mm)/45 caliber Mark 10 gun; 4 × 4 in (100 mm)/40 guns; 2 × 3 in (76 mm)/50 anti-aircraft guns; 4 × 3-pounder(47 mm (1.9 in)) saluting guns; 2 × 1-pounder (37 mm (1.5 in)) guns

The first USS Minneapolis (C-13/CA-17) was a United States Navy Columbia-class protected cruiser. She was named for the city of Minneapolis, Minnesota.

Minneapolis was laid down 16 December 1891 by William Cramp & Sons, Philadelphia; launched 12 August 1893, sponsored by Miss Elizabeth Washburn, daughter of Senator William D. Washburn of Minnesota; and commissioned at Philadelphia, 13 December 1894, Captain George H. Wadleigh, in command. The class was originally designed with three funnels; however, Columbia was built with four and Minneapolis with two. This may have been to make them resemble specific passenger liners.

== Early duties ==
Assigned to the North Atlantic Squadron, the new cruiser took part in maneuvers and cruises along the eastern seaboard and in the West Indies until she was assigned to the European Squadron 27 November 1895, arriving Gibraltar, 13 December. After cruising in the Mediterranean Sea, she visited Kronstadt, Russia, 13 May to 19 June, as flagship of Rear Admiral Thomas O. Selfridge Jr., representing the United States at the coronation of Czar Nicholas II. Following visits to principal ports of northern Europe, she returned to Turkey and Greece. She departed Gibraltar 21 June 1897 and arrived at Philadelphia 6 July. The next day, she was placed in reserve at League Island Navy Yard, Philadelphia.

== Spanish–American War ==
Upon outbreak of the Spanish–American War, Minneapolis was assigned to the Northern Patrol Squadron operating along the north Atlantic coast of the United States. In April 1898, she was dispatched for scouting duty in the West Indies, searching for Admiral Cervera's fleet as far as the coast of Venezuela, and returning to Santiago de Cuba, 19 May 1898, en route to Key West, Florida.

== Peace time duties ==
She decommissioned at Philadelphia 18 August 1898 and remained in ordinary in League Island Navy Yard until recommissioned as a receiving ship, 23 April 1902. She again decommissioned at League Island Navy Yard, Philadelphia, 2 June 1903 and recommissioned 5 October 1903. She took part in the Louisiana Purchase Celebration at New Orleans, Louisiana from 16 to 28 December, and spent much of the next year cruising the West Indies.

Minneapolis arrived New London, Connecticut 23 May 1905 to participate in the unveiling of the John Winthrop Monument, then was assigned to a Special Service Squadron with collier Caesar and screw steamer Dixie, under the command of Rear Admiral Colby Mitchell Chester, to make astronomical and other scientific observations off the coast of Spain and Africa.

She sailed from New York 3 July 1905 and arrived at Gibraltar on the 17th, carrying scientists to observe the solar eclipse, 30 August 1905. She departed the Mediterranean 10 November 1905 and sailed via France and England to the United States arriving Hampton Roads, 23 December.

She was at Annapolis, Maryland, 20 April to 5 May 1906, for ceremonies commemorating the arrival of the body of John Paul Jones, and, after taking midshipmen on a practice cruise, conducted training cruises for men of the naval militias of New York and Connecticut. She decommissioned at Philadelphia on 7 November 1906 and remained in ordinary until the United States entered World War I.

== World War I ==
Recommissioned 2 July 1917, Minneapolis got underway from Philadelphia 15 September for Hampton Roads, and departed that base 26 October for Colon, Panama Canal Zone, where she joined British transports Arawa and Corinthia. The vessels sailed from Colon 6 November and steamed by way of Hampton Roads to Halifax, Nova Scotia. The cruiser continued to operate along the Atlantic coast until assigned to transatlantic convoy duty 24 February 1918. During the next 8 months, she made four escort voyages, departing New York and sailing to ocean rendezvous where the convoys were turned over to British destroyers. On her last voyage, she departed New York on 9 October as escort for a convoy to Sydney, Nova Scotia, and returned to New York, 19 October.

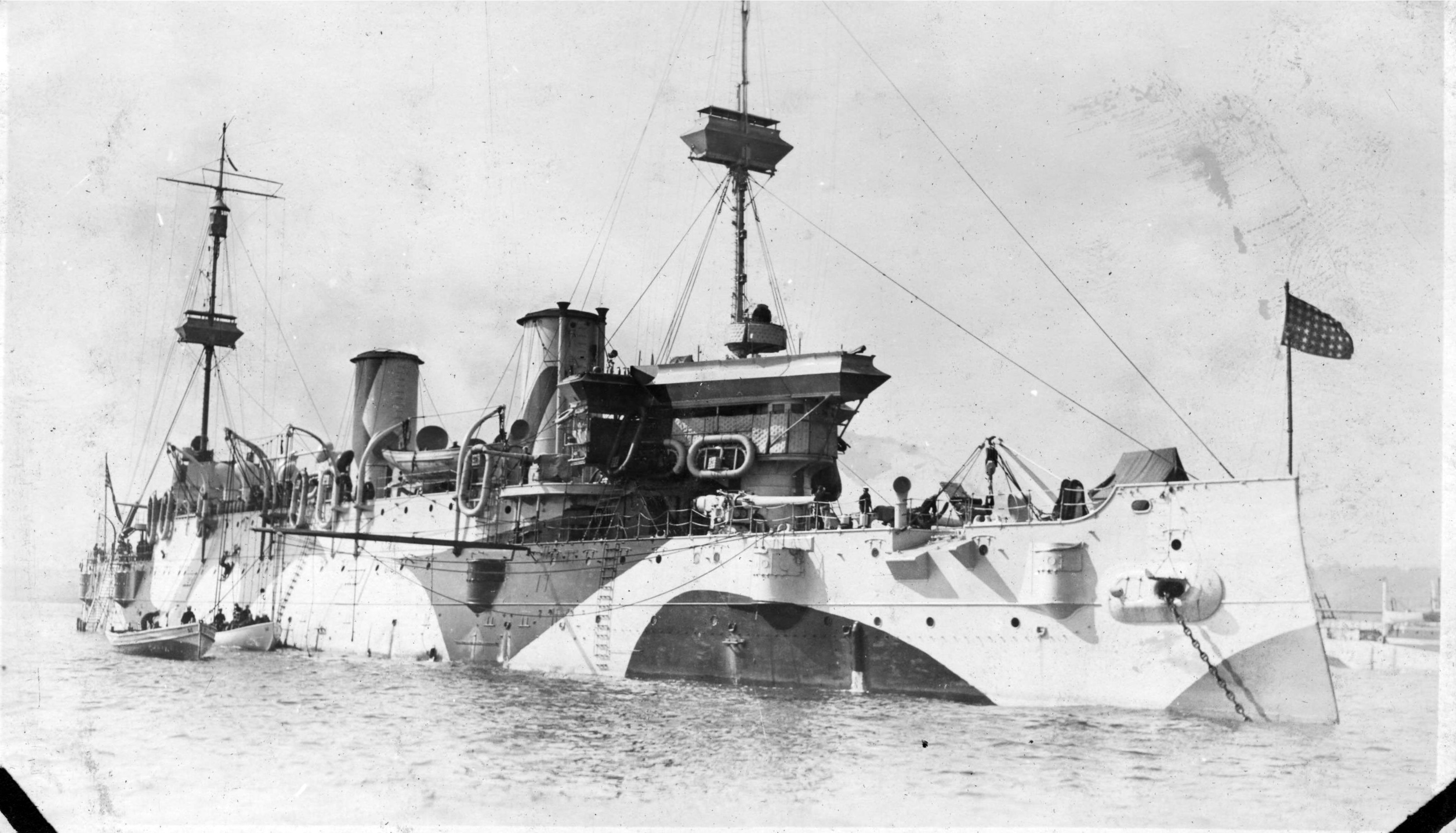
Collection photo number S-023.01: USS Minneapolis (C-13) in dazzle camouflage

== Post war and final decommissioning ==
Minneapolis was then assigned to the Pacific Station as flagship, arriving in San Diego, California on 7 February 1919. She was decommissioned at the Mare Island Navy Yard two years later, on 15 March 1921, and sold on 5 August 1921. Her mast is preserved on the northeastern shore of Bde Maka Ska near the Lake Street boat launch in Uptown, Minneapolis (44°56′55.0″N 93°18′23.0″W). The bell was used at Minnetonka High School before being returned, along with the wheel, to the Minneapolis Park Board in 2021.
