= French cruiser Desaix =

French Dupleix-class armoured cruiser

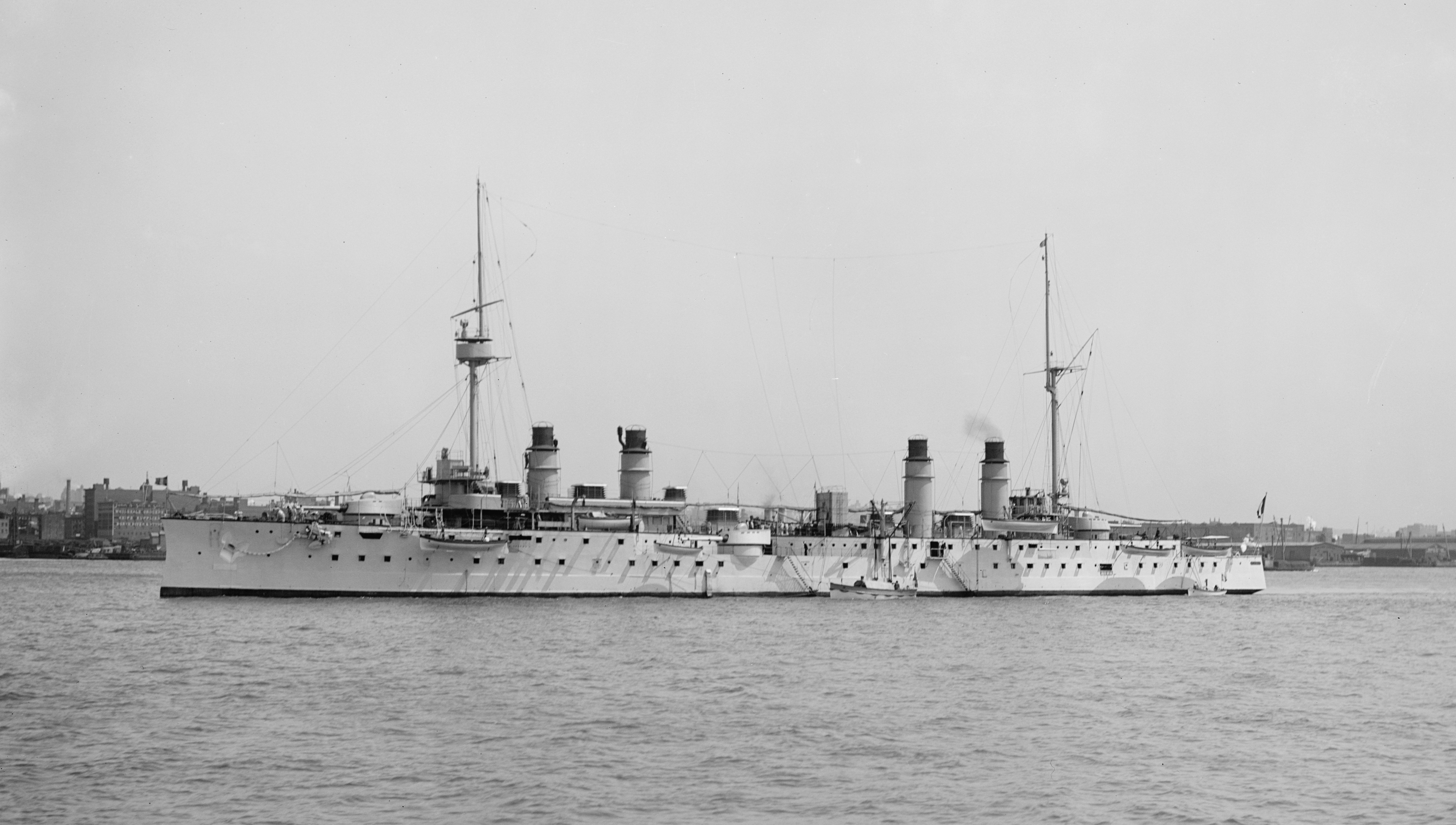
- Sister ship Kléber at anchor at the Jamestown Exposition, June 1907

History

France
- Name: Desaix
- Namesake: Louis Desaix
- Ordered: 28 December 1897
- Builder: Ateliers et Chantiers de la Loire, Nantes
- Laid down: early 1899
- Launched: 21 March 1901
- Commissioned: 5 April 1904
- Stricken: 27 July 1921
- Fate: Scrapped, 1927

General characteristics
- Class & type: Dupleix-class cruiser
- Displacement: 7,700 t (7,578 long tons)
- Length: 132.1 m (433 ft 5 in) (o/a)
- Beam: 17.8 m (58 ft 5 in)
- Draft: 7.46 m (24 ft 6 in)
- Installed power: 17,100 PS (12,600 kW); 24 Belleville boilers
- Propulsion: 3 shafts; 3 triple-expansion steam engines
- Speed: 20.6 knots (38.2 km/h; 23.7 mph)
- Range: 6,450 nmi (11,950 km; 7,420 mi) at 10 knots (19 km/h; 12 mph)
- Complement: 569; 607 as flagship
- Armament: 4 × twin 164.7 mm (6.5 in) guns; 4 × single 100 mm (3.9 in) guns; 10 × single 47 mm (1.9 in) guns; 4 × single 37 mm (1.5 in) guns; 2 × 450 mm (17.7 in) torpedo tubes
- Armor: Waterline belt: 84–102 mm (3.3–4.0 in); Deck: 42–70 mm (1.7–2.8 in); Gun turrets: 110 mm (4.3 in); Barbettes: 120 mm (4.7 in); Conning tower: 100–120 mm (3.9–4.7 in)

The French cruiser Desaix was one of three Dupleix-class cruisers built for the French Navy (Marine Nationale) in the first decade of the 20th century. Designed for overseas service and armed with eight 164.7-millimeter (6.5 in) guns, the ships were smaller and less powerfully armed than their predecessors. Completed in 1904, Desaix was initially assigned to the Mediterranean Squadron (Escadre de la Méditerranée) before she was transferred to the Atlantic Division (Division de l'Atlantique) the following year, where she served as a flagship. The cruiser returned to the Mediterranean in 1906, but only remained there for a year before rejoining the Atlantic Division. Desaix was in reserve from 1909 to 1914.

As tensions rose shortly before the beginning of World War I in August 1914, the ship was reactivated. When the war began she was assigned to defend Allied shipping in the English Channel and intercept German ships attempting to pass through. Transferred back to the Mediterranean in early 1915, Desaix spent the next year patrolling off the coast of the Ottoman Levant and in the central Mediterranean. To help protect Allied shipping from German commerce raiders, the ship was transferred to French West Africa in mid-1916 and remained there for the rest of the war. She served in the Far Eastern Division (Division navale de l'Extrême Orient) in 1919–1921 and was decommissioned shortly after her return. Desaix was sold for scrap in 1927.

== Design and description ==
The Dupleix-class ships were much smaller and more lightly armed than the preceding Jeanne d'Arc. They measured 132.1 meters (433 ft 5 in) long overall with a beam of 17.8 meters (58 ft 5 in) and had a maximum draft of 7.46 meters (24 ft 6 in). The cruisers displaced 7,700 metric tons (7,578 long tons) as designed. They normally had a crew of 19 officers and 550 enlisted men, but accommodated 24 officers and 583 enlisted men when serving as a flagship.

The sister ships' propulsion machinery consisted of three vertical triple-expansion steam engines, each driving a single propeller shaft, using steam provided by water-tube boilers, but the types of machinery differed between them. Desaix had four-cylinder engines fed by 24 Belleville boilers that were designed to produce a total of 17,100 metric horsepower (12,600 kW) intended to give them a maximum speed of 21 knots (39 km/h; 24 mph). Despite exceeding her horsepower rating, the ship failed to reach her designed speed during her sea trials on 17 November 1903, only attaining 20.6 knots (38.2 km/h; 23.7 mph) from 17,861 metric horsepower (13,137 kW). The sisters carried up to 1,200 metric tons (1,200 long tons; 1,300 short tons) of coal and could steam for 6,450 nautical miles (11,950 km; 7,420 mi) at a speed of 10 knots (19 km/h; 12 mph).

=== Armament and protection ===
The ships of the Dupleix class had a main armament that consisted of eight quick-firing (QF) Canon de 164.7 mm Modèle 1893–1896 guns. They were mounted in four twin-gun turrets, one each fore and aft of the superstructure and a pair of wing turrets amidships. The cruisers' secondary armament consisted of four QF Canon de 100 mm (3.9 in) Modèle de 1893 guns on single mounts in casemates in the hull. For defense against torpedo boats, they carried ten 47-millimeter (1.9 in) and four 37-millimeter (1.5 in) Hotchkiss guns, all of which were in single mounts. The ship were also equipped with two above-water 450-millimeter (17.7 in) torpedo tubes, one on each broadside.

The nickel steel armor belt of the Dupleix-class cruisers covered the entire waterline length of the ship except for 18.9 meters (62 ft) of the stern. The belt armor was 102 millimeters (4 in) thick, although it reduced to 84 millimeters (3.3 in) in front of the forward turret. The curved protective deck had a total thickness of 42 millimeters (1.7 in) on the flat and 70 millimeters (2.8 in) on the upper part of the curved portion where it met the bottom edge of the belt armor. The face and sides of the gun turrets were protected by 110-millimeter (4.3 in) Harvey face-hardened armor plates. The armor protection of the gun barbettes was 120 millimeters (4.7 in) thick. The 100-millimeter guns were in unprotected embrasures in the hull. The sides of the elliptical conning tower were 100 to 120 millimeters thick.

== Service history ==
Named after the French Revolutionary-era General Louis Desaix, the ship was ordered from Ateliers et Chantiers de la Loire on 28 December 1897. Construction was considerably delayed when the armament configuration was revised after the ship had already been laid down; the contract for Desaix was revised to account for the changes on 3 September 1899. The cruiser was laid down at their shipyard in Nantes in early 1899 and launched on 21 March 1901. Desaix began her sea trials on 6 August 1902 and she was finally commissioned on 5 April 1904. The ship cost 19,068,975 francs.

Desaix was assigned to the Mediterranean Fleet's Light Squadron (Escadre légère) upon completion, together with her sister Kléber. Desaix relieved her other sister, Dupleix, as the flagship of the Atlantic Division in September 1905, but replaced Kléber in the Light Squadron when she returned to the Mediterranean in November 1906. Desaix rejoined the Atlantic Division in 1908, but was placed in reserve in 1909 and remained in that status for the next five years.

=== World War I ===
As tensions rose during the July Crisis of 1914, Desaix, Kléber and the other cruisers in reserve were reactivated. The sisters were assigned to the 3rd Light Division (3^{e} Division légère (DL)) of the 2nd Light Squadron (Escadre 2^{e} légère) which was tasked to defend the English Channel in conjunction with the British. The 3rd DL was on station in the western end of the Channel by 4 August, where they were tasked to intercept German shipping and provide distant cover to the smaller ships escorting the transports conveying the British Expeditionary Force to France.

Improved defenses in the Channel and the stabilization of the front in early 1915 allowed the cruisers to be released from their tasks, so Desaix was assigned to the 3rd Squadron upon her arrival in the Eastern Mediterranean on 16 February. The squadron was tasked to patrol the area between Port Said, Egypt, and Alexandretta, Ottoman Syria. The cruiser was detached in May to assist the 1st Naval Army (1^{re} Armée Navale) in the Central Mediterranean with searching for German shipping near Italian ports; Desaix was tasked to watch Palermo, Sicily from 18 May. After 6 June, when the Italians agreed to take over that duty, the cruiser was assigned to reinforce the 2nd DL as it patrolled the area between Capo Colonna in southern Italy and the easternmost point of the Greek island of Crete. Later that month, she rejoined the 3rd Squadron and was tasked to help blockade the Ottoman coast from Latakia, Syria, to Mersin, together with the protected cruiser Guichen and the seaplane carrier Foudre. The ships helped to rescue a group of Armenian refugees who were being pursued by the Ottomans from the mountains near Antioch, Syria, on 12–13 September.

The successes of German merchant raiders like Möwe in 1916 caused the Allies to transfer cruisers to the Atlantic to protect their shipping. Desaix joined her sisters in the newly formed 6th DL in April 1916, based in Dakar, French West Africa. To release manpower for higher-priority patrol boats, the 6th DL was reduced to two ships and renamed the Coast of Africa Division (Division navale de la côte d'Afrique) on 18 May 1917. The division was disbanded on 14 September when Dupleix was sent home to be placed in reserve. Desaix remained at Dakar for the rest of the war, tasked to escort convoys in the South Atlantic.

The ship returned to France after the war, but was assigned to the Far Eastern Division in 1919. Departing in November her service there was uneventful and the ship arrived back in France on 31 March 1921 after which she was decommissioned. Desaix was stricken from the Navy List on 27 July, but was not sold for scrap until 1927.
