= Louis Jaurès =

French naval officer

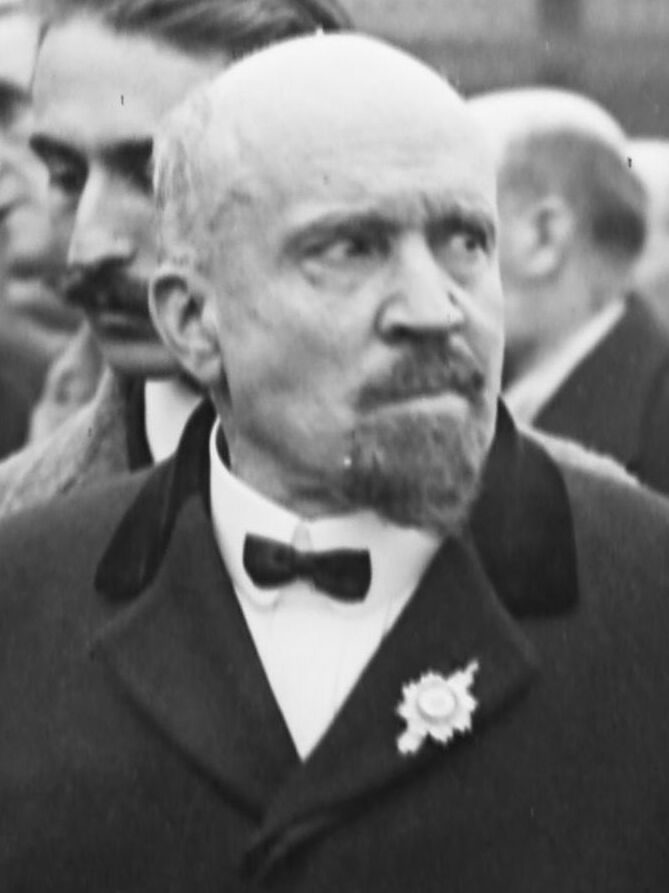
- Louis Jaurès in November 1924 during the transfer of the ashes of Jean Jaurès to the Panthéon

Deputy for the Seine
- In office 11 May 1924 – 31 May 1928

Personal details
- Born: Marie Paul Louis Jaurès; 18 August 1860 Castres, Tarn, France.
- Died: 30 October 1937 (aged 77) Paris, France
- Party: Republican-Socialist Party
- Occupation: Naval officer, politician

Louis Jaurès (18 August 1860 – 30 October 1937) was a French naval officer who rose to the rank of rear admiral during World War I. He was the brother of the statesman Jean Jaurès. After retirement he was elected a deputy in the National Assembly of France.

== Naval career ==
=== Early years ===
Marie Paul Louis Jaurès was born in Castres, Tarn, on 18 August 1860. His parents were Jules Jaurès (1819–82), a cloth merchant, and Adélaïde Barbaza (1822–1906). (Note: The marriage certificate of Jules Jaurès in the departmental archives of Tarn say he was a manufacturer (fabricant). The birth certificate of his son Jean Jaurès says he was a merchant (négociant). On the birth certificate of Louis Jaurès he is called a proprietor (propriétaire).) His father was a committed Orléanist. His brother was the future socialist leader Jean Jaurès (1859–1914). His father's first cousins were the admirals Charles and Benjamin Jaurès, whom Jean and Louis considered as uncles. (Note: Admiral Benjamin Jaurès gave solid support to Jean's political career. After he died on 13 March 1889 both the deputy Jean Jaurès and the lieutenant Louis Jaurès were present in the funeral cortege in Paris.)

Louis and Jean Jaurès both studied at the Collège de Castres. Louis was a good student, and won the second prize in geography. In 1878 the Jaurès brothers were at an event in Castres where the sub-Prefect spoke in praise of the French nation but did not mention the Republic, and ended with "Vive la France!". Louis Jaurès at once called out "Vive la République!". When a Bonapartist colonel reprimanded him, Jaurès responded that France was indeed a republic. Neither his father or brother supported him.

In 1876 Jaurès entered the École Navale. In September 1880 he was a midshipman (aspirant) on the aviso Dumont d'Urville. He became an ensign (enseigne de vaisseau) on 5 October 1881. In 1881 he was on board the cruiser Magicienne, a sailing ship, in the Antilles naval division. In 1882 he was on the aviso Boursaint, where he spent three years in the Indian Ocean, at Madagascar and on the coast of East Africa.

=== Lieutenant ===
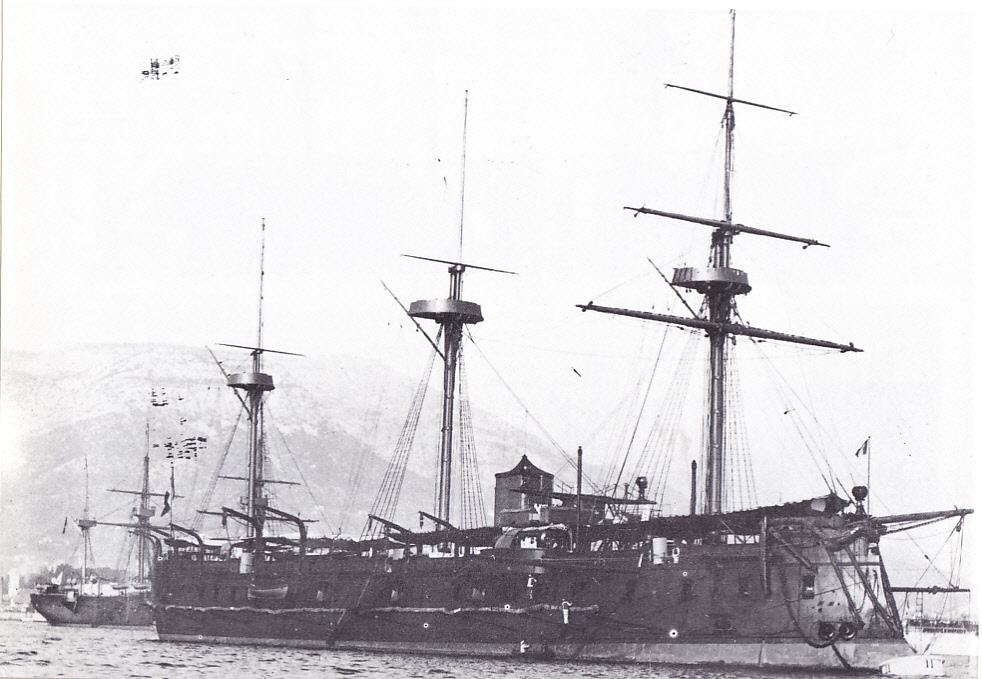
French ironclad Friedland

Jaurès was promoted to lieutenant (lieutenant de vaisseau) on 16 February 1885. He returned to Madagascar and on 23 October 1885 helped with the great festival organized by the Republicans to celebrate their recent electoral victory. In 1886 he was assigned to the ironclad Friedland in the research squadron commanded by Jacques Béhic. In September 1887 he went on a mission to Japan. In 1889 he was on the ironclad Courbet, and in 1891 on the ironclad Marengo. On 3 February 1892 he was given command of the submarine Gymnote and carried out trials of underwater navigation. (Note: The official history edited by Jean Jolly says Jaurès was appointed to command the Gymnote in 1886, at the age of 26, and conducted the first trials. However, the Gymnote was not launched until 24 September 1888, and Jaurès did not take command until February 1892.) On 15 February 1893 Jaurès was given command of the torpedo boat n°126 in the mobile defense of Corsica. In April 1894 he was posted to the transport Vinh-Long in Indochina.

In 1895 Jaurès married Madeleine Duprat (1873–97). Their daughter Yvonne was born in 1896, married in 1918 and lived until 1982. In 1897 he studied at the École de canonnage on the Couronne. In 1898 he commanded the transport Japon at Toulon. In September 1899 he was assigned to the armoured coastguard Bouvines. He was made aide de camp to Commodore Charles Malarmé, commander of the coastguard division. In July and August 1900 he undertook a mission to Tonkin.

=== Commander and captain ===
Jaurès was promoted to Commander (capitaine de frégate) on 3 September 1900. On 1 January 1901 he was made second in command of the ironclad battleship Carnot in the Northern Squadron commanded by Paul Campion. In 1903 he was commander of the 3rd class cruiser Galilée at Toulon, then in the Mediterranean squadron commanded by Edouard Pottier. He led the expedition on the Galilée that rescued the sailors abandoned by Jacques Lebaudy in Mauritania and captured by the Moors during Lebaudy's attempt to establish his "Empire of the Sahara". On 1 May 1905 he was made commander of the fixed defenses of Toulon. In October 1906 Jaurès was promoted to captain (capitaine de vaisseau). From 25 March 1908 until 1910 he commanded the armoured cruiser Gloire in the Northern Squadron.

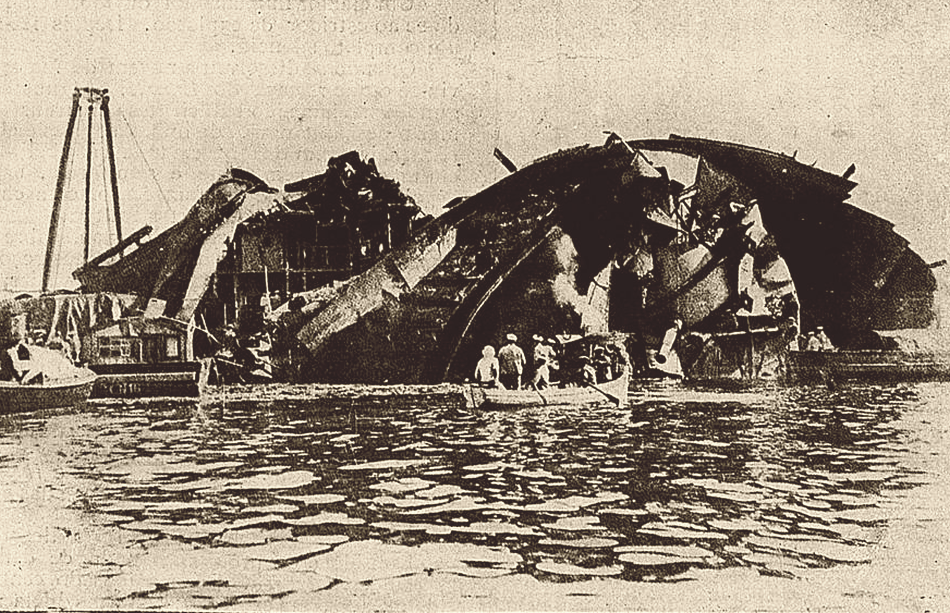
Wreckage of the Liberté in Toulon harbour on 1 November 1911

On 24 November 1910 Jaurès was given command of the battleship Liberté, Mediterranean squadron. The ship exploded in the harbor of Toulon on 25 September 1911 while he was on leave. After the explosion there was a debate in the Chamber of Deputies in which the honour of Jaurès and the responsibility for the use of unstable powder by the navy was questioned. Jaurès had to face a court martial, but was acquitted unanimously on 21 December 1911. However, for several weeks he had to endure strong attacks in the press, probably aimed as much at his brother as at him. From 30 April 1912 to 30 April 1913 he commanded the battleship Démocratie.

=== Commodore and rear admiral ===
Jaurès was promoted to commodore (contre-amiral) on 15 January 1914. On 7 February 1914 he was appointed Major General of the 1st maritime division in Cherbourg. During World War I (1914–18) he commanded the armored division of the Dardanelles in 1915. His flagship was the battleship Suffren. In 1916 and 1917 he was in command of the light division off French West Africa responsible for protecting Australian and New Zealand troop transports and convoys of food against privateers and German submarines. His flagship was the armored cruiser Kléber. He was promoted to rear admiral (vice-amiral) on 14 December 1917. He became a member of the Superior Council of the Navy. On 18 December 1917 he was appointed Maritime Prefect of the 1st maritime district in Cherbourg. In 1919 he was appointed Maritime Prefect of the 4th maritime district in Rochefort. Jaurès retired from the navy in 1922, becoming an officer of the reserve.

== Later career ==
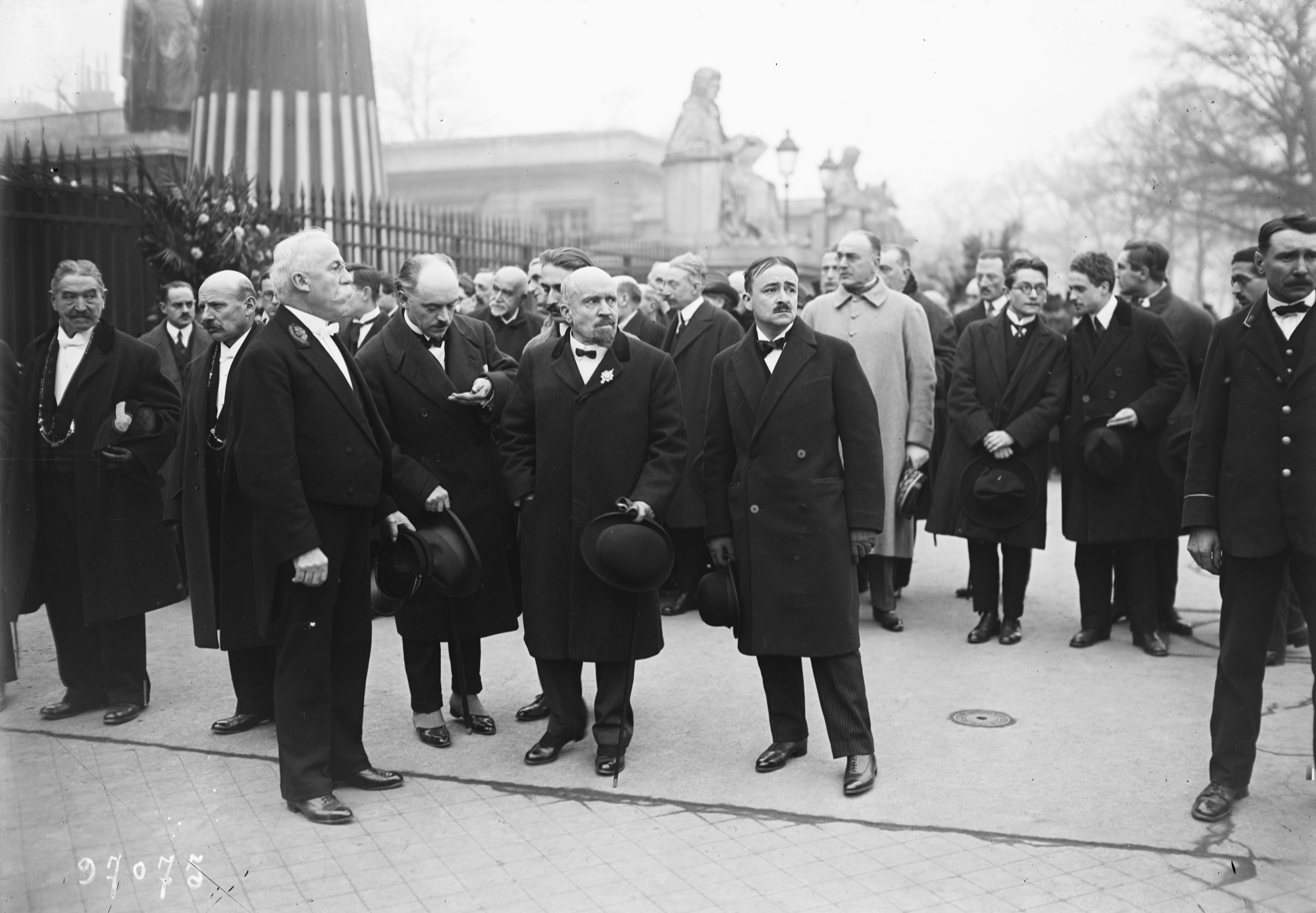
23 November 1924, transfer of the ashes of Jean Jaurès to the Panthéon. Admiral Jaurès in centre

Jaurès was elected to the legislature in 1924 for the 2nd riding of the Seine department on the cartel des gauches platform. He held office from 11 May 1924 to 31 May 1928. He joined the Socialist Republican and French Socialist group in the chamber of deputies. He was a member of the Merchant Marine and Navy committees. He was involved in legislation aimed at raising tax revenues. He decided not to run for reelection in the 1928 general election. Louis Jaurès died in Paris on 30 October 1937.

== Honours ==
Louis Jaurès was made a Knight of the Legion of Honour on 1 September 1890. He was later promoted to Grand Officer of the Legion of Honour. He was awarded the Madagascar commemorative medal, Order of Saint Anna (Russia), Cross of Naval Merit (Spain), Order of Osmanieh (Turkey), Order of Aviz (Portugal) and Distinguished Service Medal (United States).

== Sources ==
- Base collaborative Pierfit, "Amiral Louis JAURÈS", geneanet (in French)
- Candar, Gilles; Duclert, Vincent (2014-02-05), Jean Jaurès (in French), Fayard, ISBN 978-2-213-68377-5
- Dufeil, Yves; Le Bel, Franck; Terraillon, Marc (9 August 2008), "Cuirassé DEMOCRATIE" (PDF), Navires de la Grande Guerre
- Dulou, Bernard, "Marie Paul Louis JAURÈS", ecole.nav.traditions (in French)
- Goldberg, Harvey (1962), The Life of Jean Jaurès, Univ of Wisconsin Press, ISBN 978-0-299-02564-9
- Jolly, Jean (1960), "Jaurès (Marie Paul Louis)", Dictionnaire des parlementaires français de 1889 à 1940 (in French)
- Jaurès, Jean (2009-09-09), Oeuvres: Les années de jeunesse (1859-1889) (in French), Fayard, ISBN 978-2-213-68315-7
- Jogerst, Gilles (2008), Base des Officiers de la Marine Nationale et des Colonies de 1824 à 1917 (in French)
- Lemaire, Dominique (9 January 1979), GYMNOTE - EX Q.1 (in French)
- Louis Jaurès (in French), Assemblée nationale
