= French cruiser D'Entrecasteaux =

Protected cruiser of the French Navy

- Sketch of D'Entrecasteaux, c. 1899

Class overview
- Operators: French Navy; Belgian Navy; Polish Navy
- Preceded by: Catinat class
- Succeeded by: Guichen

History

France
- Name: D'Entrecasteaux
- Namesake: Antoine Bruni d'Entrecasteaux
- Builder: Société Nouvelle des Forges et Chantiers de la Méditerranée
- Laid down: September 1894
- Launched: 13 June 1896
- Completed: 1899
- Commissioned: 15 February 1899
- Decommissioned: 1 June 1921
- Stricken: 27 October 1922
- Fate: Loaned to Belgium, 1923

History

Belgium
- Acquired: 1923
- Fate: Returned to France, 1926

History

France
- Acquired: 1926
- Fate: Sold to Poland, 7 March 1927

History

Second Polish Republic
- Name: Król Władysław IV
- Namesake: Władysław IV Vasa; Baltic Sea
- Acquired: 7 March 1927
- Renamed: Bałtyk
- Fate: Broken up, c. 1942

General characteristics
- Type: Protected cruiser
- Displacement: 7,995 long tons (8,123 t)
- Length: 120.92 m (396 ft 9 in) (loa)
- Beam: 17.85 m (58 ft 7 in)
- Draft: 7.52 m (24 ft 8 in)
- Installed power: 5 × fire-tube boilers; 8,500 metric horsepower (8,400 ihp)
- Propulsion: 2 × triple-expansion steam engines; 2 × screw propellers
- Speed: 19.2 knots (35.6 km/h; 22.1 mph)
- Range: 5,500 nmi (10,200 km; 6,300 mi) at 10 kn (19 km/h; 12 mph)
- Complement: 559
- Armament: 2 × 240 mm (9.4 in) guns; 12 × 138 mm (5.4 in) guns; 12 × 47 mm (1.9 in) guns; 6 × 37 mm (1.5 in) guns; 2 × 450 mm (17.7 in) torpedo tubes
- Armor: Deck: 20 to 80 mm (0.79 to 3.15 in); Gun turrets: 190 to 230 mm (7.5 to 9.1 in); Casemates: 52 mm (2.0 in); Conning tower: 230 mm (9.1 in)

D'Entrecasteaux (French: [dɑ̃tʁ(ə)kasto]) was a large protected cruiser built for the French Navy in the 1890s. The only vessel of her class, D'Entrecasteaux was intended to serve as a flagship of the cruiser squadron that defended French Indochina and other possessions in the Far East. Her construction came during a period of conflict in the French naval command between factions that favored different cruiser types; D'Entrecasteaux represented the ideas of the Jeune École, who favored large cruisers for long-range operations overseas. She was armed with a main battery of two 240 mm (9.4 in) guns, the largest guns ever carried aboard a French cruiser, though their great weight, coupled with her pronounced ram bow degraded her seaworthiness. She nevertheless provided the basis for later armored cruisers.

D'Entrecasteaux was initially deployed to Indochina, where she took part in Eight-Nation Alliance operations during the Boxer Uprising, including the Battle of the Taku Forts in June 1900. Problems with her guns forced her to return to France for repairs in 1903, though she returned to Indochina for another tour from 1905 to 1909. She was modernized in 1909–1912 and served as the flagship of the Training Squadron until the start of World War I in July 1914. The ship spent much of the war in the eastern Mediterranean Sea, where she assisted in the defense of the Suez Canal from Ottoman attacks and patrolled the coast of Ottoman Syria. She was transferred for operations elsewhere after 1916, including supporting Arab rebels in the Red Sea and escorting convoys in the Indian Ocean.

After the war, D'Entrecasteaux helped to carry French troops back from the Armée d'Orient (Army of the East) before being placed in reserve in June 1919. She was struck from the naval register in 1922 and transferred to the Belgian Navy in 1923, where she served as a depot ship for three years. After briefly returning to France in 1926, she was sold to the Polish Navy in 1927, which renamed the vessel Król Władysław IV and then Bałtyk. Employed as a stationary training ship, she remained in Polish service until the German invasion of Poland in September 1939, when she was damaged by German aircraft. She was captured by the Germans and used as a barracks ship before being broken up around 1942.

== Background ==
In the mid-1880s, elements in the French naval command argued over future warship construction; the Jeune École advocated building long-range and fast protected cruisers for use as commerce raiders on foreign stations while a traditionalist faction preferred larger armored cruisers and small fleet scouts, both of which were to operate as part of the main fleet in home waters. This led to the development of two types of cruisers: medium ships of 3,000 to 4,000 long tons (3,048 to 4,064 t) and smaller ships of around 2,000 to 2,400 long tons (2,032 to 2,439 t). By the end of the decade and into the early 1890s, the traditionalists were ascendant, leading to the construction of several armored cruisers of the Amiral Charner class, though the supporters of the Jeune École secured approval for one large cruiser built according to their ideas, which became D'Entrecasteaux. They were able to leverage the acquisition of French Indochina in the 1880s, which required a permanent squadron of warships to control and defend the colony. D'Entrecasteaux was intended to serve as a flagship for the squadron, and as such, was designed with additional facilities to accommodate an admiral and his staff.

== Design ==
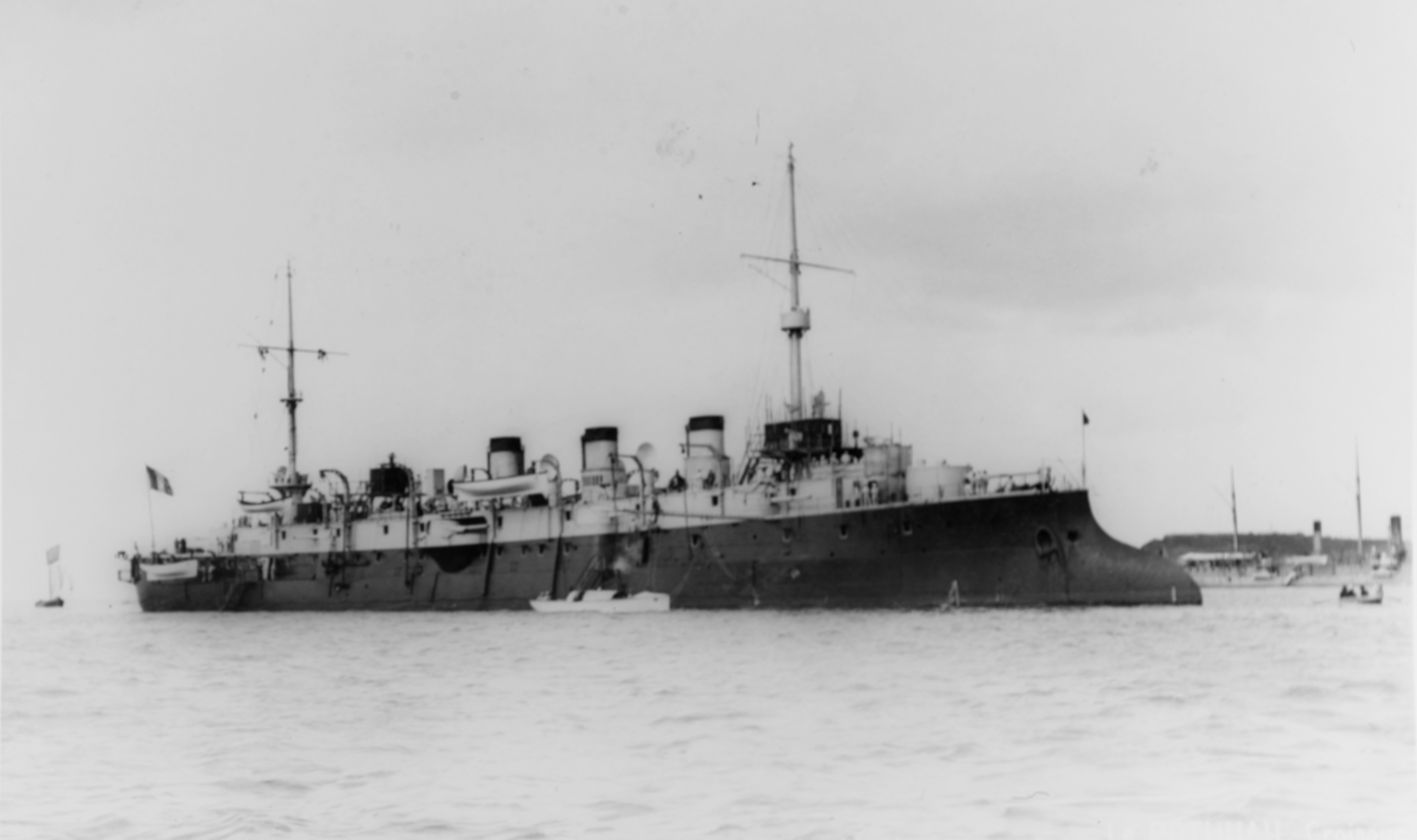
The armored cruiser Pothuau, which preceded D'Entrecasteaux

Design work on the ship began in 1891 with a version armed with four 240 mm (9.4 in) guns in the same lozenge arrangement as the contemporary pre-dreadnought battleships like Charles Martel. They were also to carry eight 138 mm (5.4 in) guns. The Conseil des Travaux (Council of Works) decided in a meeting on 7 July that displacement should be limited to 7,900 long tons (8,000 t) if possible; this limitation precluded an armament of four large-caliber guns if the latest water-tube boilers were retained. In an attempt to keep displacement under the limit, the Conseil considered scaling down the level of armor protection or reducing the caliber or number of guns. They ultimately decided to remove the amidships 240 mm guns and to supplement the ship's firepower with four more 138 mm guns.

The refined design included a sailing rig to supplement the ship's engines on long voyages overseas, but the French naval ministry issued a directive on 2 March 1892 to abandon the use of sails in cruising warships. D'Entrecasteaux's design was accordingly altered. The Conseil then issued requests for finalized designs meeting their specifications from four naval architects and three private shipyards, which were evaluated during a meeting on 29 March. Three proposals were chosen for further refinement, and after a second round, two were approved on 31 January 1893. After further evaluation, the Conseil ship proposed by the architect Amable Lagane, of the Société Nouvelle des Forges et Chantiers de la Méditerranée shipyard, on 8 November. By the time the design was finalized, weight constraints had forced Lagane to abandon water-tube boilers for fire-tube boilers, which were smaller but obsolescent.

A sister ship to D'Entrecasteaux was approved on 21 August 1895, which was to have been built to the second design the Conseil had approved, and was to have been named Jeanne d'Arc. But the new naval minister, Édouard Lockroy, cancelled the ship in early 1896 in favor of another armored cruiser without consulting the Conseil, which oversaw naval construction. Lockroy was replaced as naval minister in April 1896, and his successor, Armand Besnard, attempted to secure parliamentary approval for another D'Entrecasteaux-class cruiser, but the Chamber of Deputies refused, ending the project.

D'Entrecasteaux represented an evolutionary step between the smaller armored cruiser Pothuau and the larger armored cruisers that followed, beginning with Jeanne d'Arc. In addition, her design was used as the basis of the medium armored cruisers of the Dupleix class, which were also intended to serve overseas. D'Entrecasteaux nevertheless suffered from defects that curtailed her active career, most significantly design defects that hampered her seakeeping. The heavy main gun forward, coupled with the ram bow, caused her to ship considerable amounts of water in heavy seas.

=== General characteristics and machinery ===
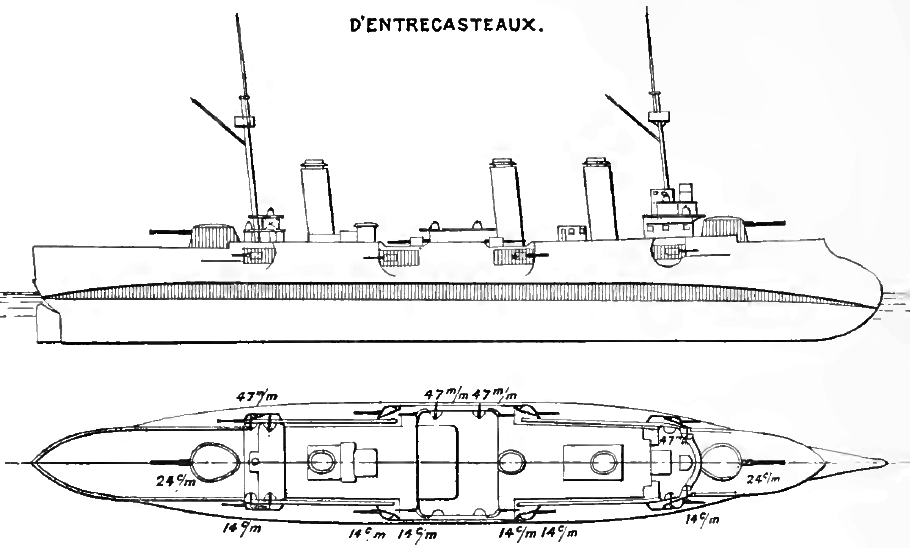
Plan and profile drawing of D'Entrecasteaux

D'Entrecasteaux was 120 m (393 ft 8 in) long between perpendiculars and 120.92 m (396 ft 9 in) long overall, with a beam of 17.85 m (58 ft 7 in) and a draft of 7.52 m (24 ft 8 in). She displaced 7,995 long tons (8,123 t). Her hull had a flush deck and a pronounced ram bow, and was sheathed in teak and a copper layer to protect it from biofouling on long voyages overseas. As was typical for French warships of the period, she had a significant tumblehome shape.

The ship proved to be poorly ventilated and thus very hot in service, necessitating cooling equipment in her ammunition magazines. D'Entrecasteaux was fitted with a pair of light pole masts for observation and signalling purposes. Her superstructure was fairly minimal, consisting of a small conning tower and bridge structure forward and a smaller, secondary conning position aft. Because she was intended to serve as a flagship, she was outfitted with accommodations for an admiral and his staff. Her crew numbered 559 officers and enlisted men, and a flag staff added another 28 officers and men.

The ship's propulsion system consisted of a pair of 3-cylinder vertical triple-expansion steam engines driving two screw propellers. The engines were placed side by side amidships, each in an individual engine room. Steam was provided by five coal-burning, double-ended fire-tube boilers; four were placed further forward, ducting into two funnels, and the fifth boiler was further aft, with its own funnel. The forward set of boilers was divided into two boiler rooms. The boilers proved to be troublesome in service, particularly in comparison to the water-tube boilers used in other French cruisers.

Her machinery was rated to produce 8,500 metric horsepower (8,400 ihp) normally and up to 13,500 CV (13,300 ihp) on forced draft, for a top speed of 19 knots (35 km/h; 22 mph). She reached a maximum speed of 19.2 knots (35.6 km/h; 22.1 mph) during sea trials in 1899. Coal storage amounted to 960 long tons (980 t), which allowed D'Entrecasteaux to steam for 5,500 nautical miles (10,200 km; 6,300 mi) at a speed of 10 knots (19 km/h; 12 mph).

=== Armament ===
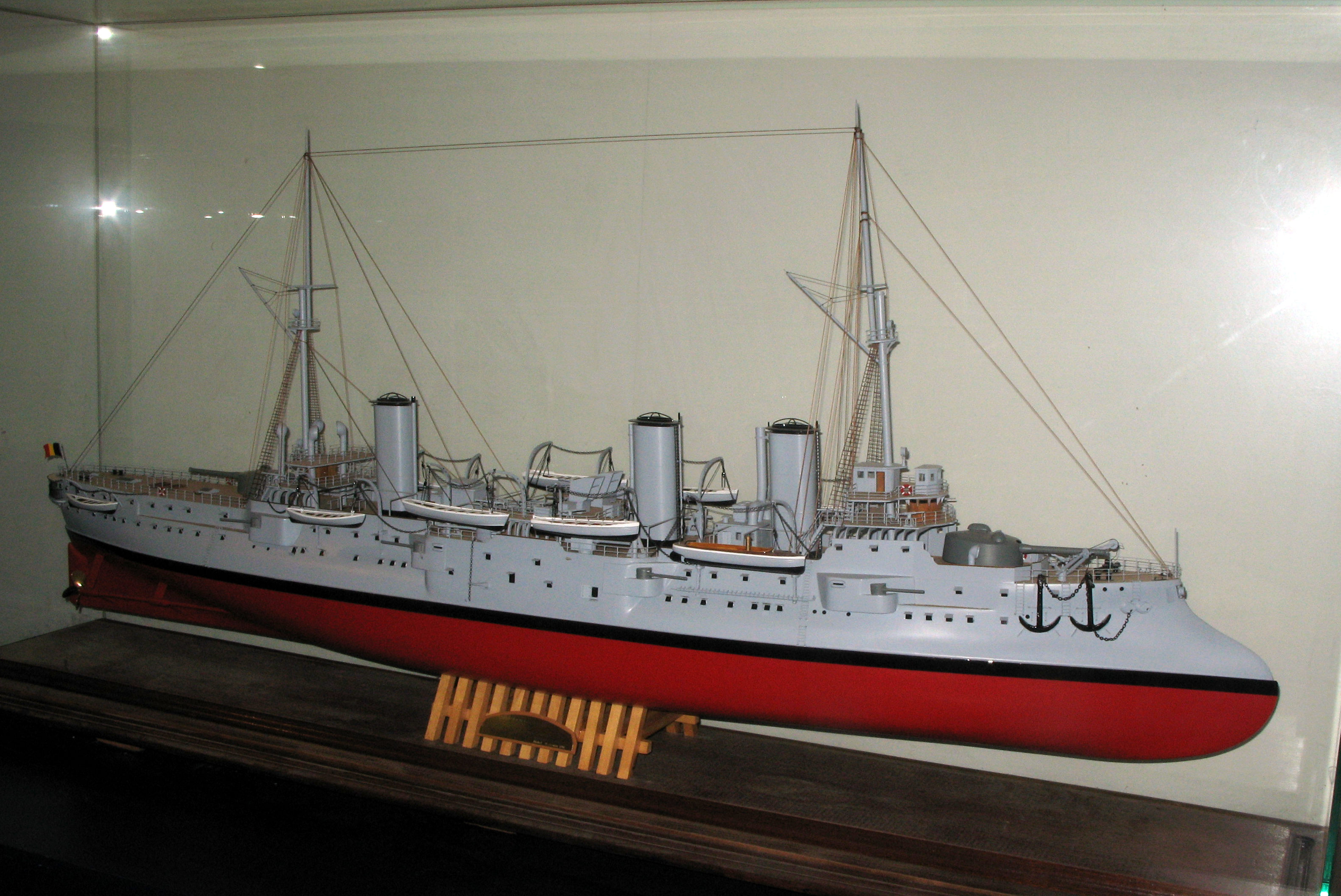
Model of D'Entrecasteaux

The ship was armed with a main battery of two 240 mm (9.4 in) 40-caliber (cal.) M1893 guns, which were placed in single-gun turrets, one forward and one aft on the centerline. These guns were the largest to be installed aboard a French cruiser of any type. The turrets were electrically operated, and allowed elevation of the guns to 20 degrees. Three types of shell were carried, including a 145 kg (320 lb) cast iron projectile, along with armor-piercing and semi-armor-piercing shells, both of which weighed 170 kg (370 lb). The shells had a muzzle velocity of 830 to 865 m/s (2,720 to 2,840 ft/s), depending on the type.

These were supported by a secondary battery of twelve 138.6 mm (5.46 in) Model 1893 45-cal. guns, eight of which were carried in individual casemates in the main deck. The other four were in gun shield-protected pivot mounts on the upper deck. For close-range defense against torpedo boats, she carried twelve 47 mm (1.9 in) 3-pounder Hotchkiss guns and six 37 mm (1.5 in) 1-pounder guns.

She was also armed with four 450 mm (17.7 in) torpedo tubes, two in her hull below the waterline and the other two in trainable, deck-mounted launchers. The deck tubes were placed amidships, one on each broadside, while the submerged tubes were just aft of the forward main battery gun and were in fixed positions. These were supplied with a total of twelve Model 1892 torpedoes. They carried a 75 kg (165 lb) warhead and had a range of 800 m (2,600 ft) at a speed of 27.5 knots (50.9 km/h; 31.6 mph). She had a storage capacity for twenty naval mines, which was typical for cruisers intended to serve overseas. She had no minelaying apparatus, as the mines were only intended to be used to help defend a port, and they would have been laid by smaller boats.

=== Armor ===
Armor protection consisted of nickel steel armor. She had a curved armor deck; on the flat portion in the central part of the ship where it protected the machinery spaces, the deck was 30 mm (1.2 in) thick. It sloped downward at the sides and increased in thickness to 80 mm (3.1 in). Toward the bow and stern, the deck was decreased slightly to 20 mm (0.79 in) on the flat and 60 mm (2.4 in) on the slopes. All of the deck armor was attached to a pair of underlying layers of 10 mm (0.39 in) thick mild steel. A second deck consisting of another double layer of 10 mm steel was above the flat portion of the main deck with a cofferdam connecting it to the main deck; this upper deck formed the roof of the secondary battery. The cofferdam was subdivided extensively to contain flooding in the event of damage.

D'Entrecasteaux's conning tower was heavily armored with 230 mm (9.1 in) of nickel steel on the sides, also backed by two layers of 10 mm mild steel. The tower's roof consisted of two layers of 25 mm (0.98 in) of steel. Her semi-elliptical main battery turrets received the same level of protection on the front, but thinned at the sides and rear to 190 mm (7.5 in) with the same mild steel backing. Their supporting barbettes were 170 mm (6.7 in) above the battery deck and 120 mm (4.7 in) below. Each casemate consisted of 52 mm (2 in) plating with the double 10 mm backing.

== Service history ==
=== French career ===
D'Entrecasteaux underway during sea trials in 1898

D'Entrecasteaux, named for Admiral Antoine Bruni d'Entrecasteaux, was built at the Société Nouvelle des Forges et Chantiers de la Méditerranée shipyard in La Seyne-sur-Mer. She was ordered on 8 November 1893 and was laid down in June 1894, was launched on 12 June 1896, and was commissioned on 1 January 1898 to begin sea trials. During testing on 28 April, one of her boilers burst, scalding four stokers badly and delaying her completion by six months. The ship was completed in early 1899 and was placed in full commission on 15 February. She was immediately ordered to the Far East to join the Division navale d'Extrême-Orient et du Pacifique occidental (Naval Division of the Far East and Western Pacific) and serve as its flagship, where she replaced the old ironclad Vauban. After departing on 6 April, she reached Saigon in French Indochina on 12 May, where she joined the protected cruisers Descartes, Pascal, and Jean Bart. Rear Admiral de Courejolles hoisted his flag aboard D'Entrecasteaux on 1 June and she thereafter embarked on a long voyage around East Asia, sailing as far north as China.

She took part in the colonialist response to the Boxer Uprising in China in 1900, joining in the Battle of the Taku Forts in June as part of the Eight-Nation Alliance. During the bombardment, she suffered problems with her main battery guns' breech blocks and locking mechanisms. These deficiencies compelled D'Entrecasteaux's return to Toulon for repairs; she arrived there on 9 January 1901. There, her main battery guns were removed and sent to the factory in Ruelle to have new breech blocks installed; the work lasted until June. While D'Entrecasteaux was in Toulon, Rear Admiral Charles-Jesse Bayle replaced de Courejolles as the divisional commander, and he brought with him Captain Louis Dartige du Fournet as his flag captain. She then returned to East Asia, arriving in Saigon on 8 August. The ship spent the next two in the region, taking cruises in Chinese and Japanese waters in 1901 and 1902 before returning to Toulon in 1903, being decommissioned there on 12 February for a major overhaul that lasted through 1905.

D'Entrecasteaux at some point before 1905

After emerging from the shipyard, D'Entrecasteaux was recommissioned on 1 September 1905, and sailed on 25 November 1905 for French Indochina, by way of a brief assignment to the Indian Ocean command. She then moved to the Naval Division of the Far East and Western Pacific. On 15 August, she resumed flagship duties when Rear Admiral Boisse transferred from the protected cruiser Guichen. The unit also included the armored cruisers Bruix and Dupetit-Thouars, the protected cruiser Alger, four gunboats, and five destroyers. D'Entrecasteaux served on the station for the next four years, and during this period, she was involved in the unsuccessful attempt to re-float the armored cruiser Chanzy on 20 May 1907, which had run aground off the coast of China. D'Entrecasteaux departed Saigon on 25 October 1909 to return to Toulon.

The French Navy considered converting D'Entrecasteaux into a training ship for naval cadets following her return home in 1909 to replace the armored cruiser Jeanne d'Arc, but the plan came to nothing. She instead was decommissioned on 1 January 1910, to undergo an extensive overhaul that included repairs to her propulsion system and her hull. Cooling systems for her secondary battery magazines were also installed, along with improved fire-control systems, a new Barr & Stroud rangefinder, and a wireless telegraphy compartment. Her torpedo tubes were also removed, as she had never used them. The ship was recommissioned on 1 January 1912 to serve as the flagship of the Training Division of the Mediterranean Squadron, replacing the old battleship Brennus in that role, and flying the flag of Rear Admiral Bertrand Sourrieu. D'Entrecasteaux was in turn replaced by the battleship Suffren on 15 November 1913, and she was decommissioned ten days later. In early 1914, the navy considered using D'Entrecasteaux to replace Pothuau as a gunnery training vessel, but the changes had not been made by the outbreak of World War I in August.

==== World War I ====
At the start of World War I in August 1914, D'Entrecasteaux was part of the Division spéciale, along with Pothuau and the old pre-dreadnought battleships Jauréguiberry and Charlemagne. Both of the cruisers required refits before they would be ready for active service, which were completed by the end of the month. On 5 November, France and Britain declared war on the Ottoman Empire, and D'Entrecasteaux was sent to the coast of Ottoman Syria, arriving there on 29 November to join the Division de Syrie (Syrian Division) with the armored cruiser Amiral Charner. The two cruisers were tasked with patrolling the 600 km (370 mi) length of coastline between Jaffa to Alexandretta.

D'Entrecasteaux was sent to Port Said at the northern entrance to the Suez Canal in January 1915 to reinforce the defenses there against an impending Ottoman attack. During this period, on 31 January, French naval forces in the region were reorganized as the 3^{e} Escadre (3rd Squadron) and D'Entrecasteaux became the flagship of now-Vice Admiral Dartige du Fournet. She and the old coastal defense ship Requin played a critical role in defeating the Ottoman infantry in their assault on 3 February. Their gunfire broke up the advancing Ottoman columns and Requin silenced the Ottoman heavy artillery battery. D'Entrecasteaux fired a total of five 240 mm shells and thirty-six 138 mm rounds at a range of 6,300 to 6,700 m (20,700 to 22,000 ft) in the course of the action. The next day, Dartige du Fournet transferred to the pre-dreadnought Saint Louis.

On 25 March, D'Entrecasteaux bombarded Ottoman positions in Gaza. In late April, fears that the Ottoman Empire was planning an attack on the Suez Canal prompted the French to send D'Entrecasteaux, the protected cruiser D'Estrées, and Jeanne d'Arc to Port Said to reinforce the warships supporting the land defenses of the canal. No attacks materialized, and the ships were sent to bombard Ottoman positions along the coast to force them to disperse their units rather than make attacks on the Suez Canal. Dartige du Fournet also established a set of three patrol zones to cover the Syrian coast on 6 May, and D'Entrecasteaux was assigned to the first sector, which covered the area between the Suez Canal and Tyre. The French declared a blockade of the coast on 25 June. The ship was detached for a refit in Brest late in the year. As additional forces arrived in the region, the French reorganized the squadron into two divisions, D'Entrecasteaux being assigned to the 2nd Division in November. She became the flagship of Rear Admiral Henri de Spitz, though she did not arrive on the Syrian coast until 20 December.

Vice Admiral Frederic Moreau, the squadron commander by early 1916, opposed continuing patrols of the Syrian coast, as Ottoman maritime traffic had essentially stopped and he could not justify the expenditure of coal. The sinking of Amiral Charner by a German U-boat on 8 February strengthened his position, and further patrols were curtailed. D'Entrecasteaux was again detached in March for another refit. After its conclusion, the ship was assigned to the Moroccan Naval Division, but on 14 September, the protected cruiser Lavoisier arrived in Tangier to relieve her. D'Entrecasteaux was sent to Ethiopia with Pothuau in October in response to unrest in the country, but pressure from Britain, which feared that France was trying to assert influence in the country, led the French to withdraw the cruisers.

In late 1916, Ottoman forces had made significant progress toward defeating the Arabs who had rebelled against Ottoman rule at the instigation of the British. Vice Admiral Rosslyn Wemyss requested French assistance in the form of D'Entrecasteaux and Pothuau, which the French Navy dispatched to the Red Sea to provide fire support to the beleaguered Arab forces. The two cruisers operated out of Port Suez; one was on station at either of the main Arab cities of Jeddah and Rabegh while the other replenished coal at Port Suez. On 11 February 1917, the cruisers were released from these duties, as the Arabs had secured their position and the cruisers were needed elsewhere. They were then sent to the Gulf of Aden to strengthen the vessels available for convoy escort in the Indian Ocean. They were joined there by D'Estrées. D'Entrecasteaux and D'Estrées escorted convoys from Madagascar to Djibouti through May. D'Entrecasteaux was sent home for another refit in July, her place in the area eventually being taken by the protected cruiser Du Chayla.

=== Postwar career and service in the Belgian and Polish navies ===
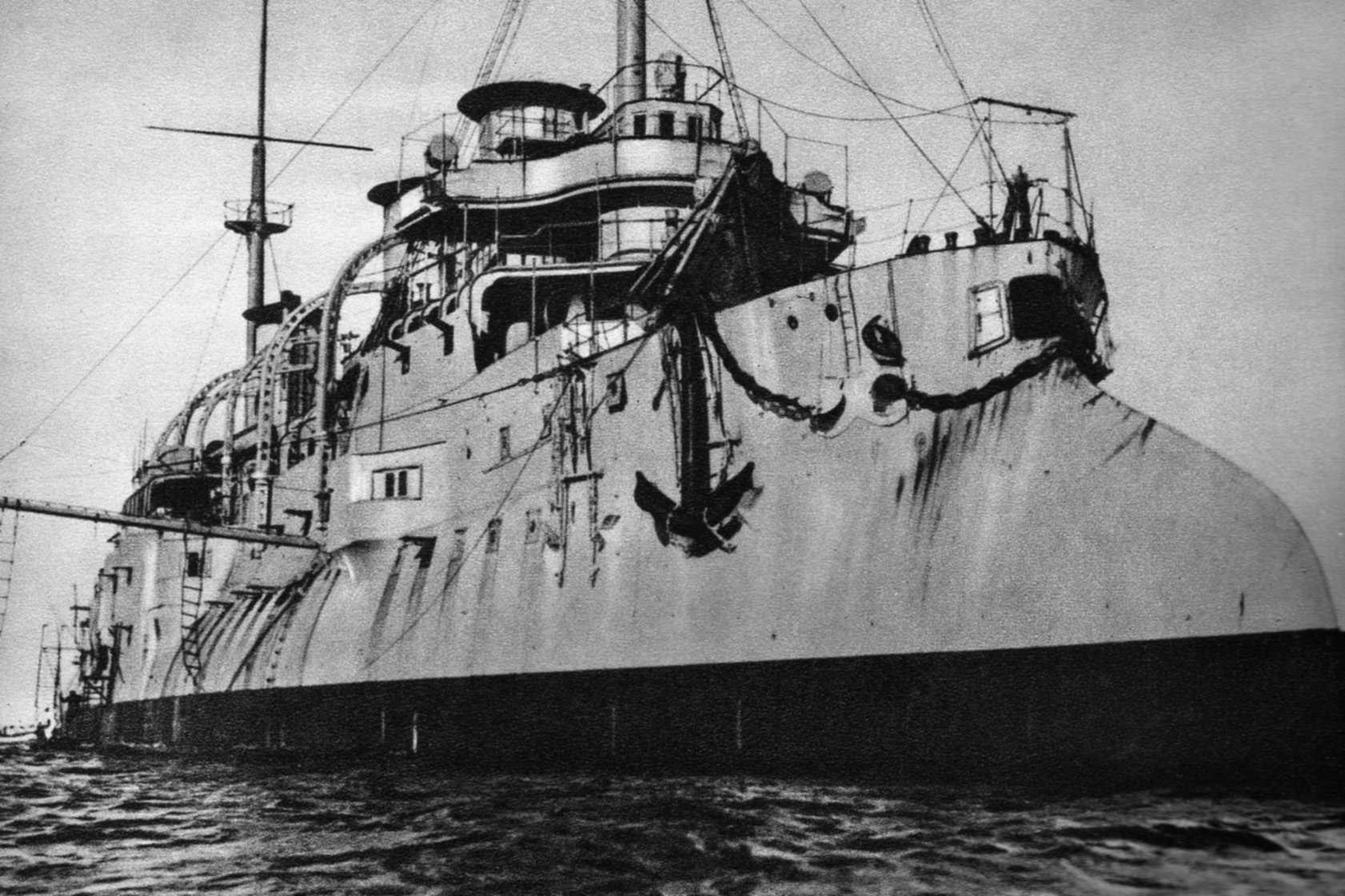
ORP Bałtyk in early 1930s

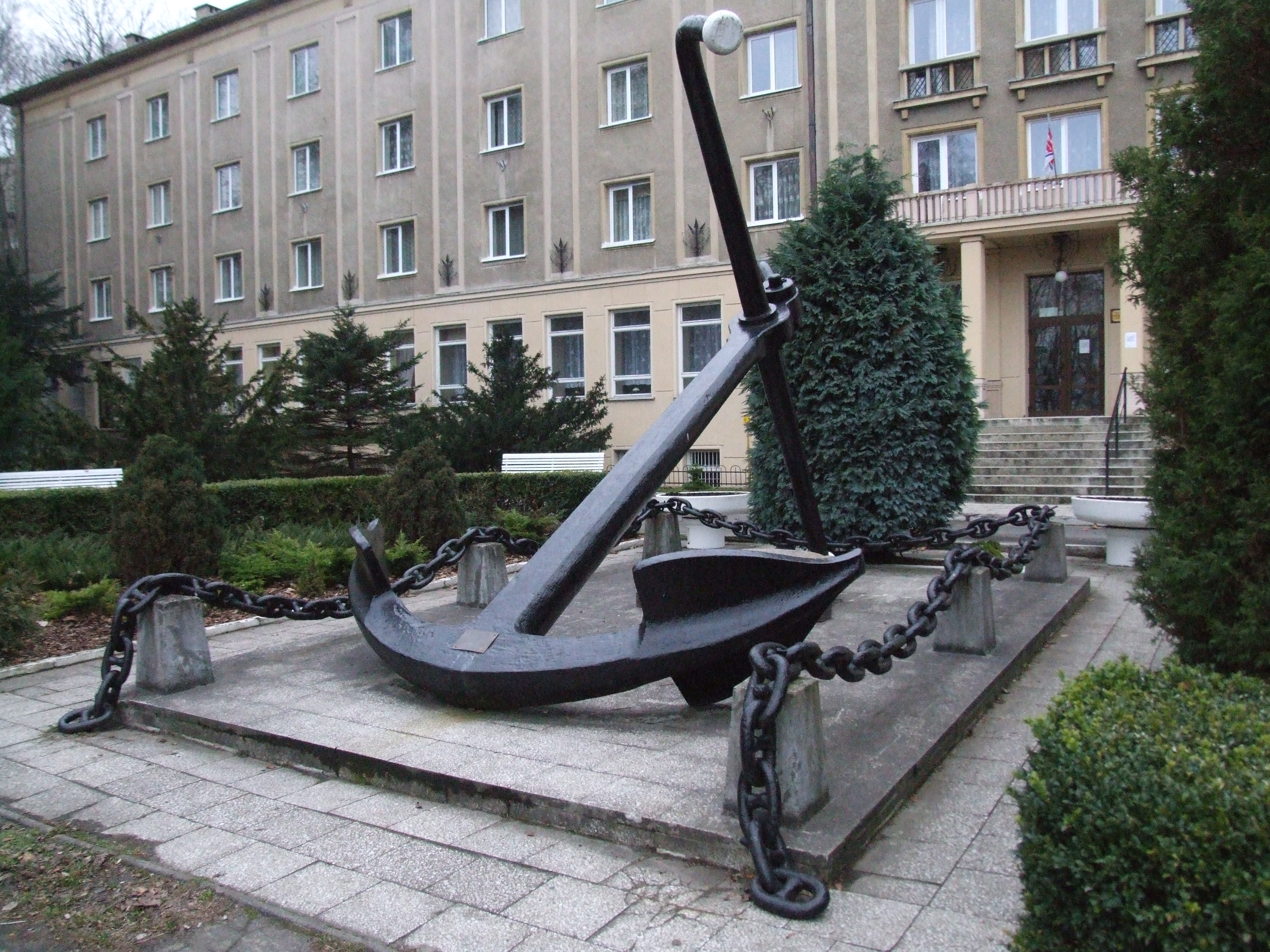
One of Bałtyk's anchors preserved as a memorial in Poland

D'Entrecasteaux was sent to Durazzo and Cattaro on 25 January 1919 as part of the fleet that monitored the transfer of ex-Austro-Hungarian Navy ships to the victorious Allied powers. On 5 September 1919, she was assigned to the training division based in Brest. She was later involved in the repatriation of elements of the Armée d'Orient (Army of the East) from Macedonia. On 2 July 1920, the ship was placed in reserve at Brest and was decommissioned on 1 June 1921. She was struck from the naval register on 27 October 1922 and transferred temporarily to the Belgian Navy the following year, being towed to Zeebrugge on 24 May 1923. She was used as a depot ship for ex-German torpedo boats that had been abandoned in Belgium after the war, serving in that role until mid-1926, when the Belgians disbanded the torpedo boat flotilla. The Belgians had made significant reductions in their naval budget and had no further need for the cruiser. The ship was towed to Cherbourg on 4 February, where she remained until 7 March 1927, when the French sold her to the Polish Navy.

In the early 1920s, the Polish Navy had explored the possibility of buying a cruiser from France to strengthen the nascent Polish fleet. The naval command initially wanted a vessel that could be used as a submarine tender to support their submarines, but the early plans fell through. After the Poles purchased D'Entrecasteaux, she was renamed Król Władysław IV (Polish for: King Władysław IV) and was then towed to Gdynia. The Minister for Military Affairs, Daniel Konarzewski, renamed her Bałtyk (Polish for Baltic Sea) on 17 September 1927. By that time, the ship was armed with only six of her 47 mm guns; plans in the late 1920s to rearm her with a battery of eight 75 mm (3 in) anti-aircraft guns to use her as a floating anti-aircraft battery came to nothing due to fears that she would be too vulnerable to air attack. The vessel was instead used as a stationary training ship in Gdynia beginning in early 1929. She became the headquarters for the naval specialists school on 1 April 1930, and during this period, she served as the flagship of Commander Józef Unrug.

During the German invasion of Poland that began on 1 September 1939, Bałtyk was hit by a bomb on her quarterdeck, which started a small fire. The Poles positioned the ship to block the entrance to the military port at Gdynia. Her crew remained aboard to help defend Gdynia from German bombers before abandoning her on 11 September as she was a large target in the harbor. Her crew thereafter served ashore and saw action at the Battle of Kępa Oksywska. German artillery bombarded the ship on 16–17 September, and on the 19th, German forces occupied the port and seized the ship. She was then used as a barracks ship by the Germans. The ship was ultimately broken up for scrap by the Germans starting in 1941; the work was completed by August 1942.
