= French cruiser Latouche-Tréville =

French Amiral Charner-class cruiser

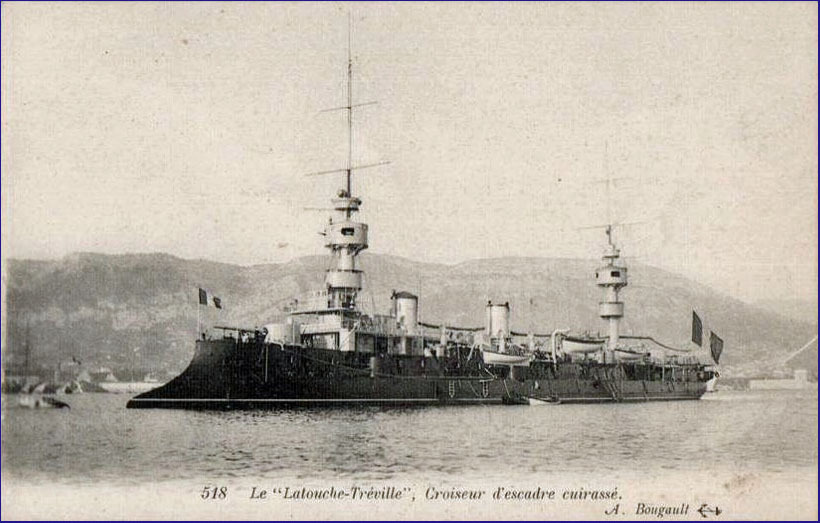
- A postcard of Latouche-Tréville at anchor

History

France
- Name: Latouche-Tréville
- Namesake: Louis-René Levassor de Latouche Tréville
- Builder: Forges et Chantiers de la Méditerranée, Le Havre-Graville
- Laid down: 26 April 1890
- Launched: 5 November 1892
- Commissioned: 6 May 1895
- Decommissioned: 1 May 1919
- Stricken: 21 June 1920
- Fate: Sold for scrap, 1926

General characteristics
- Class & type: Amiral Charner-class armoured cruiser
- Displacement: 4,748 t (4,673 long tons)
- Length: 110.2 m (361 ft 7 in)
- Beam: 14.04 m (46 ft 1 in)
- Draught: 6.06 m (19 ft 11 in)
- Installed power: 16 × Belleville boilers; 8,300–9,000 PS (6,105–6,619 kW)
- Propulsion: 2 screws; 2 × triple-expansion steam engines
- Speed: 17 knots (31 km/h; 20 mph)
- Range: 4,000 nmi (7,400 km; 4,600 mi) at 10 knots (19 km/h; 12 mph)
- Complement: 16 officers and 378 enlisted men
- Armament: 2 × single 194 mm (7.6 in) guns; 6 × single 138 mm (5.4 in) guns; 4 × single 65 mm (2.6 in) guns; 4 × single 47 mm (1.9 in) Hotchkiss guns; 8 × single 37 mm (1.5 in) 5-barreled revolver guns; 4 × 450 mm (17.7 in) torpedo tubes
- Armour: Waterline belt: 60–90 mm (2.4–3.5 in); Deck: 40–50 mm (1.6–2.0 in); Gun turrets: 92 mm (3.6 in); Conning tower: 92 mm (3.6 in)

Latouche-Tréville was one of four Amiral Charner-class armored cruisers built for the French Navy (Marine Navale) in the 1890s. The ship spent the bulk of her career in the Mediterranean and was assigned to the International Squadron off the island of Crete during the 1897–1898 uprising there and the Greco-Turkish War of 1897 to protect French interests and citizens. Latouche-Tréville spent most of the first decade of the 20th century as a training ship or in reserve. The ship was recommissioned before World War I began in 1914, and escorted convoys for several months before she was assigned to the eastern Mediterranean to support Allied operations and bombard the Ottoman-controlled coast. She was lightly damaged in 1915 by an Ottoman shell while providing naval gunfire support during the Gallipoli Campaign. Latouche-Tréville became a training ship in late 1917 and was decommissioned in 1919. She was stricken from the navy list the following year and was sold for scrap in 1926.

== Design and description ==
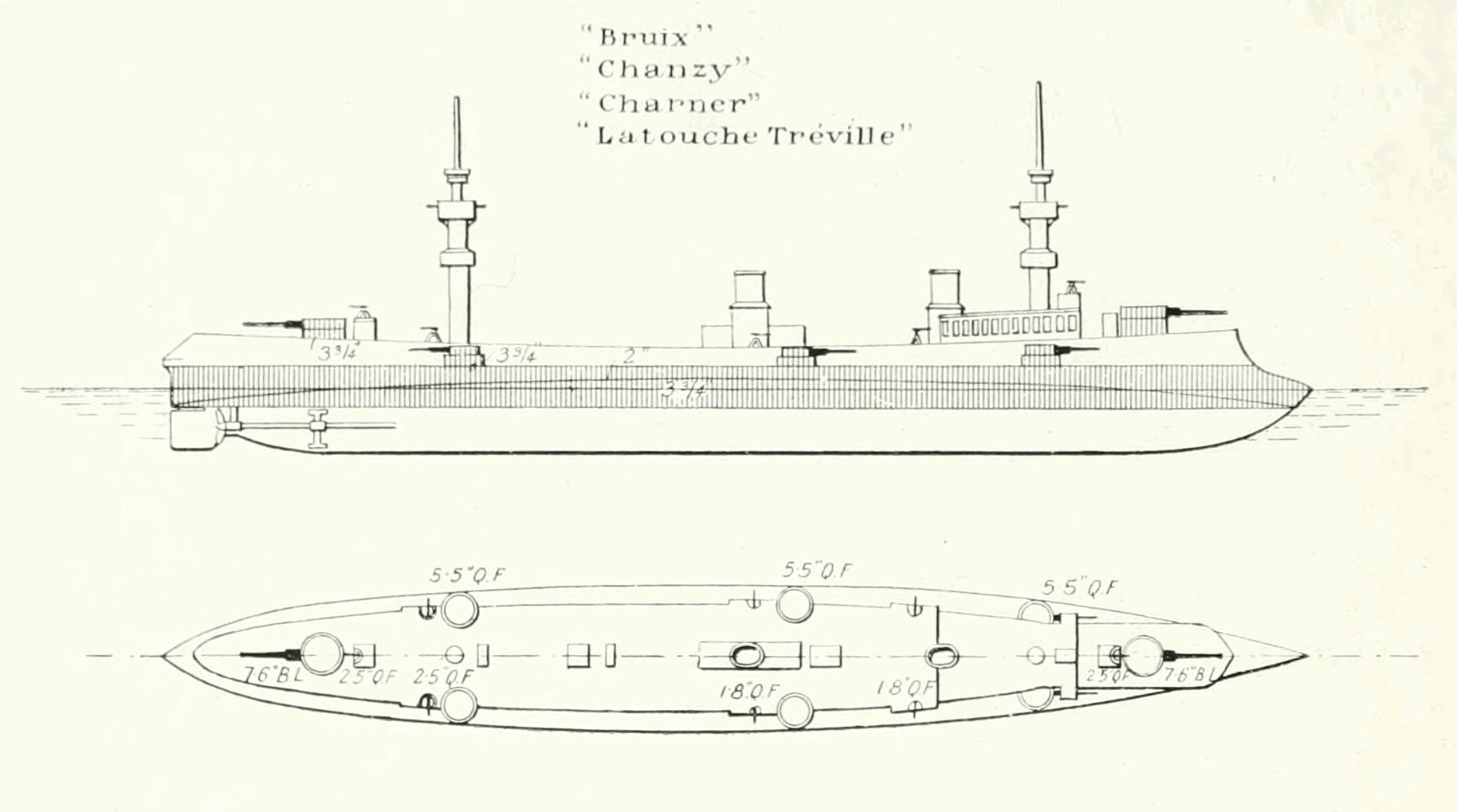
Line drawing from Brassey's Naval Annual 1902

The Amiral Charner-class ships were designed to be smaller and cheaper than the preceding armored cruiser design, the Dupuy de Lôme. Like the older ship, they were intended to fill the commerce-raiding strategy of the Jeune École.

The ship measured 110.2 meters (361 ft 7 in) long overall, with a beam of 14.04 meters (46 ft 1 in). Latouche-Tréville had a forward draft of 5.55 meters (18 ft 3 in) and drew 6.06 meters (19 ft 11 in) aft. She displaced 4,748 metric tons (4,673 long tons) at normal load and 4,990 metric tons (4,910 long tons) at deep load.

The Amiral Charner class had two triple-expansion steam engines, each driving a single propeller shaft. Steam for the engines was provided by 16 Belleville boilers and the engines were rated at a total of 8,300 metric horsepower (6,100 kW) using forced draught. Latouche-Tréville had a designed speed of 19 knots (35 km/h; 22 mph), but during sea trials on 28 December 1894 the engines produced 8,276 metric horsepower (6,087 kW), although the ship only reached a maximum speed of 18.16 knots (33.63 km/h; 20.90 mph). She carried up to 535 metric tons (527 long tons; 590 short tons) of coal and could steam for 4,000 nautical miles (7,400 km; 4,600 mi) at a speed of 10 knots (19 km/h; 12 mph).

The ships of the Amiral Charner class had a main armament that consisted of two Canon de 194 mm Modèle 1887 guns that were mounted in single gun turrets, one each fore and aft of the superstructure. Their secondary armament comprised six Canon de 138.6 mm Modèle 1887 guns, each in single gun turrets on each broadside. For anti-torpedo boat defense, they carried four 65 mm (2.6 in) guns, four 47-millimeter (1.9 in) and eight 37-millimeter (1.5 in) five-barreled revolving Hotchkiss guns. They were also armed with four 450-millimeter (17.7 in) pivoting torpedo tubes; two mounted on each broadside above water.

Unlike her sister ships, Latouche-Tréville's gun turrets were electrically powered by two dynamos, each rated at 20.8 kilowatts (27.9 hp). While they performed well during trials, the electrical installation proved to be unreliable in service. The electromagnetically operated friction clutch tended to burn out at normal operating voltages, the direct current components often caused arcing and the mechanical components wore out more quickly than anticipated. In addition the system was not water resistant and often malfunctioned when water entered the turrets, a not uncommon occurrence. It was replaced by a more reliable system in 1905.

The side of the Amiral Charner class was generally protected by 92 millimeters (3.6 in) of steel armor, from 1.3 meters (4 ft 3 in) below the waterline to 2.5 meters (8 ft 2 in) above it. The bottom 20 centimeters (7.9 in) tapered in thickness and the armor at the ends of the ships thinned to 60 millimeters (2.4 in). The curved protective deck of mild steel had a thickness of 40 millimeters (1.6 in) along its centerline that increased to 50 millimeters (2.0 in) at its outer edges. Protecting the boiler rooms, engine rooms, and magazines below it was a thin splinter deck. A watertight internal cofferdam, filled with cellulose, ran the length of the ship from the protective deck to a height of 1.2 meters (4 ft) above the waterline. Below the protective deck the ship was divided by 13 watertight transverse bulkheads, with five more above it. The ship's conning tower and turrets were protected by 92 millimeters of armor.

== Construction and career ==
Latouche-Tréville, named in honor of Vice Admiral comte de Latouche-Tréville, was laid down on 26 April 1890 at the Le Havre-Graville shipyard of Forges et Chantiers de la Méditerranée. She was launched on 5 November 1893 and commissioned for sea trials on 16 October. While initial trials were successful, further testing revealed multiple problems that required over a year and a half of work before she was commissioned for service on 6 May 1895.

Latouche-Tréville was initially assigned to the Northern Squadron (Escadre du Nord), and participated in a fleet review by President Félix Faure on 6 August 1895, before she was transferred to the 2nd Light Division of the Mediterranean Squadron on 11 January 1896. The ship was briefly assigned to the Higher Naval War College (École supérieure de guerre de la marine), with her sister Amiral Charner and the protected cruiser Suchet until she was transferred to the Reserve Squadron on 20 October. Latouche-Tréville was sent to Souda Bay, Crete, on 17 March 1897, at the outbreak of the Greco-Turkish War, and stayed there until 24 June. On 18 October the ship rejoined the light division and remained with the Mediterranean Fleet until 22 July 1904. During this time, she participated in a fleet review by King Umberto I of Italy at Cagliari, Sardinia, in April 1899, the combined fleet maneuvers with the Northern Squadron during June–July 1900 and another Presidential fleet review on 19 July. During gunnery training on 24 January 1901, her forward turret was damaged. While under repair from 1 February to 1 May, bilge keels were installed. In October 1901, Latouche-Tréville was one of the ships ordered to proceed to the port of Mytilene. After landing two companies of marines that occupied the major ports of the island on 7 November, Sultan Abdul Hamid II agreed to enforce contracts made with French companies and to repay loans made by French banks.

During a gale on 18 December 1902 in Toulon, the small cargo liner SS Médoc was blown onto the ram of Latouche-Tréville and had to be run aground lest she sink, although the cruiser was barely damaged in the incident. The ship was based at Syra in the Cyclades for duty in the eastern Mediterranean from 7 May to 16 December 1903, and then visited Naples in April 1904 together with the entire Mediterranean Squadron. Latouche-Tréville participated in the spring cruise to the eastern Mediterranean shortly thereafter, before she was placed in reserve on 22 July when the new armored cruiser Kléber replaced her in the light division. During this time, all of her 37 mm guns were removed and the number of her 47 mm guns was increased from four to eight. In addition, the electrical system for her turrets was upgraded and various other minor modifications were made.

Latouche-Tréville was recommissioned on 15 February 1907 and assigned to the gunnery school. The following month, her torpedo tubes were removed. On 22 September 1908, her aft turret was badly damaged when one of her loaded guns misfired when the breech was opened. The ignition of the propellant blew the breechblock through the turret door and threw the sighting hood onto the ship's deck. The ship was saved from being lost by a crewman who closed the door between the magazine and the ammunition hoist. Fourteen crewmen were killed and five were wounded in the incident. Repairs took until the end of the year to complete, and she resumed her duties until she was again placed in reserve on 1 January 1912. Latouche-Tréville was recommissioned on 20 November for service in the Levant; she departed Toulon on 10 December and arrived in Port Said, Egypt on 16 December. The ship was refitted in Bizerta, Tunisia, from 8 November 1913 to 26 December, during which time her military masts were replaced by light pole masts. She arrived back in Egypt on 30 December and resumed her duties.

Latouche-Tréville was recalled to Bizerta on 29 July 1914, where she unloaded surplus equipment as tensions rose shortly before the outbreak of the First World War. The ship was assigned to escort convoys between Morocco and France together with her sisters Amiral Charner and Bruix, and then blockaded the Strait of Otranto until 5 February 1915, when she was transferred to the Dardanelles. She was then transferred to the Syrian squadron on 20 March, and later bombarded Ottoman installations at Gaza and a railroad bridge at Acre in Palestine. Latouche-Tréville rejoined the Dardanelles squadron on 25 April and was providing fire support there on 4 June when her aft turret was struck by a 210-millimeter (8.3 in) shell. It killed two men and wounded five others. She was transferred to the Aegean to conduct anti-submarine patrols from 17 June to 20 August before repairs were made at Toulon from 27 August to 21 September. The ship was then returned to the Aegean to support Allied forces near Salonica, Greece, until she was ordered home on 5 January 1916 to be disinfected and refitted. After its completion on 9 February, Latouche-Tréville spent most of the next year and a half in the central and eastern Mediterranean performing a variety of missions. The ship was placed in reserve on 18 December 1917, and served as a gunnery training ship until she returned to Toulon on 31 December 1918. Latouche-Tréville was decommissioned on 1 May 1919 and condemned on 21 June 1920. Her hulk was used by the company salvaging the wreck of the battleship Liberté as accommodations and a workshop from 4 September 1920 to 1925. She was sold for scrap in 1926.

== Bibliography ==
- Campbell, N. J. M. (1979). "France". In Chesneau, Roger & Kolesnik, Eugene M. (eds.). Conway's All the World's Fighting Ships 1860–1905. Mayflower Books. pp. 283–333. ISBN 0-8317-0302-4.
- Caresse, Philippe (2012). "The Battleship Gaulois". In Jordan, John (ed.). Warship 2012. London: Conway. ISBN 978-1-84486-156-9.
- Feron, Luc (2014). "The Armoured Cruisers of the Amiral Charner Class". In Jordan, John (ed.). Warship 2014. Conway. ISBN 978-1-84486-236-8.
- Jordan, John & Caresse, Philippe (2019). French Armoured Cruisers 1887–1932. Seaforth Publishing. ISBN 978-1-5267-4118-9.
- Silverstone, Paul H. (1984). Directory of the World's Capital Ships. Hippocrene Books. ISBN 0-88254-979-0.
