= French cruiser Chanzy =

French Amiral Charner-class cruiser

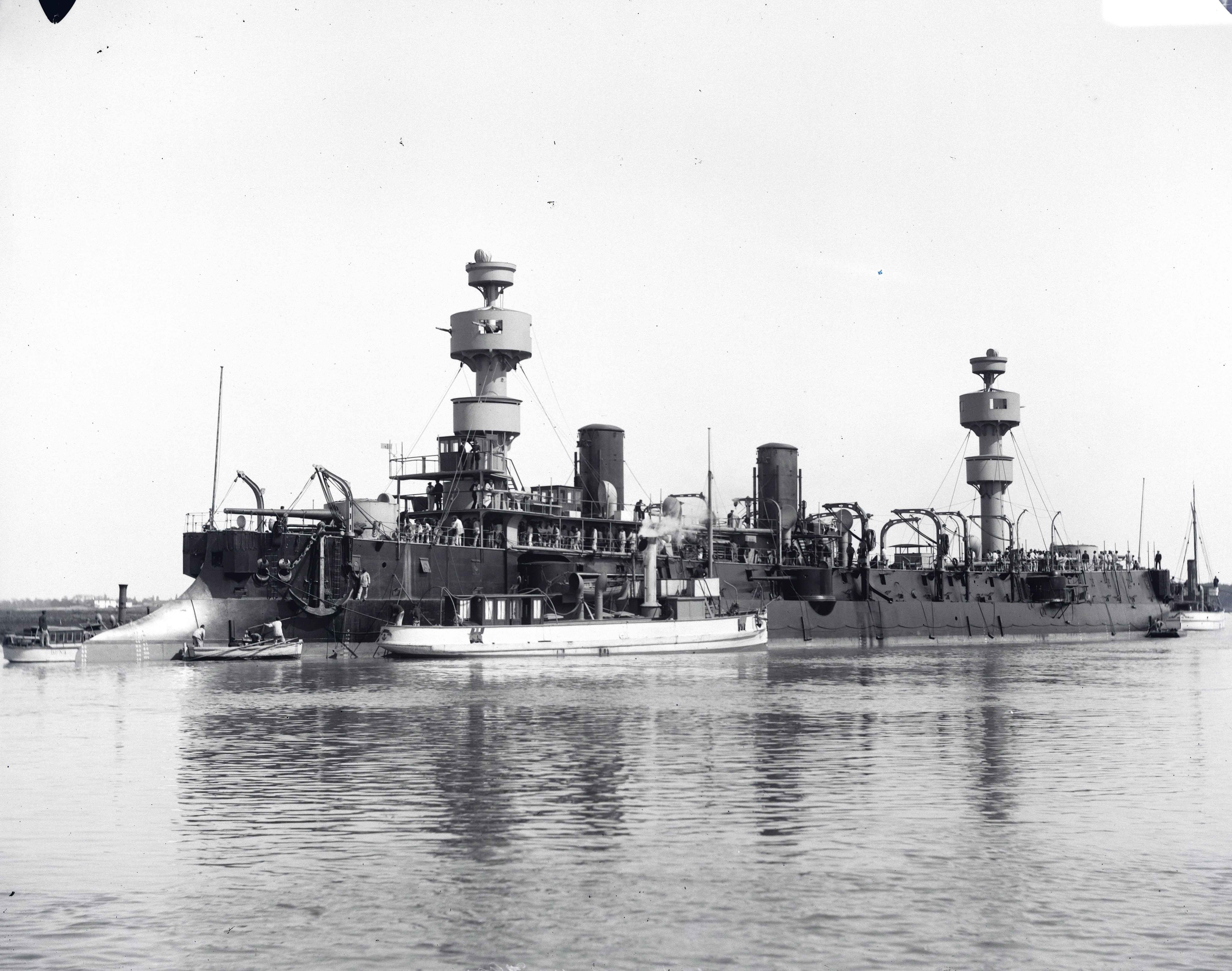

History

France
- Name: Chanzy
- Namesake: General Antoine Chanzy
- Ordered: 18 December 1899
- Builder: Chantiers et Ateliers de la Gironde, Bordeaux
- Laid down: January 1890
- Launched: 24 January 1894
- Commissioned: 6 February 1894
- Decommissioned: 20 December 1894
- In service: 20 July 1895
- Fate: Wrecked 20 May 1907; Wreck demolished 12 June 1907

General characteristics
- Class & type: Amiral Charner-class armored cruiser
- Displacement: 4,748 t (4,673 long tons)
- Length: 110.2 m (361 ft 7 in)
- Beam: 14.04 m (46 ft 1 in)
- Draught: 6.06 m (19 ft 11 in)
- Installed power: 16 × Belleville boilers; 8,300–9,000 PS (6,105–6,619 kW)
- Propulsion: 2 screws; 2 × triple-expansion steam engines
- Speed: 17 knots (31 km/h; 20 mph)
- Range: 4,000 nmi (7,400 km; 4,600 mi) at 10 knots (19 km/h; 12 mph)
- Complement: 16 officers and 378 enlisted men
- Armament: 2 × single 194 mm (7.6 in) guns; 6 × single 138 mm (5.4 in) guns; 4 × single 65 mm (2.6 in) guns; 4 × single 47 mm (1.9 in) Hotchkiss guns; 8 × single 37 mm (1.5 in) 5-barreled revolver guns; 4 × 450 mm (17.7 in) torpedo tubes
- Armour: Waterline belt: 60–90 mm (2.4–3.5 in); Deck: 40–50 mm (1.6–2.0 in); Gun turrets: 92 mm (3.6 in); Conning tower: 92 mm (3.6 in)

Chanzy was an Amiral Charner-class armored cruiser built for the French Navy (Marine Navale) in the 1890s. Upon completion, she served in the Mediterranean Squadron and she was assigned to the International Squadron off the island of Crete during the 1897–1898 uprising there and the Greco-Turkish War of 1897 to protect French interests and citizens. The ship was in reserve for several years in the middle of the first decade of the 20th century before she was transferred to French Indochina in 1906. Chanzy ran aground off the Chinese coast in mid-1907, where she proved impossible to refloat and was destroyed in place after her crew was rescued without loss.

== Design and description ==
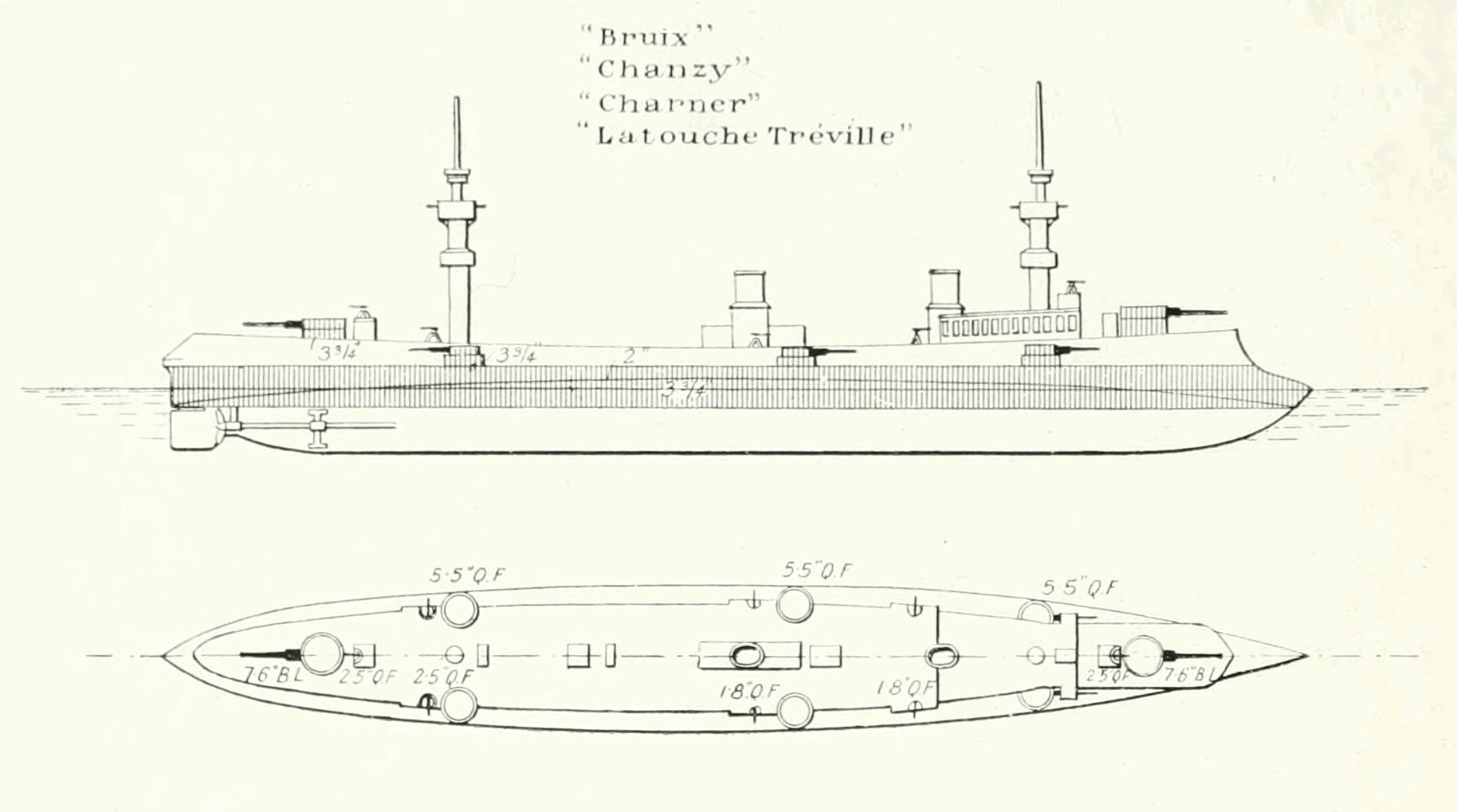
Line drawing from Brassey's Naval Annual 1902

The Amiral Charner-class ships were designed to be smaller and cheaper than the preceding armored cruiser design, the Dupuy de Lôme. Like the older ship, they were intended to fill the commerce-raiding strategy of the Jeune École.

Chanzy measured 106.12 meters (348 ft 2 in) between perpendiculars, with a beam of 14.04 meters (46 ft 1 in). The ship had a forward draft of 5.55 meters (18 ft 3 in) and drew 6.06 meters (19 ft 11 in) aft. She displaced 4,748 metric tons (4,673 long tons) at normal load and 4,990 metric tons (4,910 long tons) at deep load.

The Amiral Charner class had two triple-expansion steam engines, each driving a single propeller shaft. Steam for the engines was provided by 16 Belleville boilers and they were rated at a total of 8,300 metric horsepower (6,100 kW) using forced draft. Amiral Charner had a designed speed of 19 knots (35 km/h; 22 mph) and carried up to 535 metric tons (527 long tons; 590 short tons) of coal that allowed her to steam for 4,000 nautical miles (7,400 km; 4,600 mi) at a speed of 10 knots (19 km/h; 12 mph).

The ships of the Amiral Charner class had a main armament that consisted of two Canon de 194 mm Modèle 1887 guns that were mounted in single gun turrets, one each fore and aft of the superstructure. Their secondary armament comprised six Canon de 138.6 mm Modèle 1887 guns, each in single gun turrets on each broadside. For anti-torpedo boat defense, they carried four 65 mm (2.6 in) guns, four 47-millimeter (1.9 in) and eight 37-millimeter (1.5 in) five-barreled revolving Hotchkiss guns. They were also armed with four 450-millimeter (17.7 in) pivoting torpedo tubes; two mounted on each broadside above water.

The side of the Amiral Charner class was generally protected by 92 millimeters (3.6 in) of steel armor, from 1.3 meters (4 ft 3 in) below the waterline to 2.5 meters (8 ft 2 in) above it. The bottom 20 centimeters (7.9 in) tapered in thickness and the armor at the ends of the ships thinned to 60 millimeters (2.4 in). The curved protective deck of mild steel had a thickness of 40 millimeters (1.6 in) along its centerline that increased to 50 millimeters (2.0 in) at its outer edges. Protecting the boiler rooms, engine rooms, and magazines below it was a thin splinter deck. A watertight internal cofferdam, filled with cellulose, ran the length of the ship from the protective deck to a height of 1.2 meters (4 ft) above the waterline. Below the protective deck the ship was divided by 13 watertight transverse bulkheads with five more above it. The ship's conning tower and turrets were protected by 92 millimeters of armor.

== Construction and career ==
Chanzy, named after General Antoine Chanzy, was ordered from Chantiers et Ateliers de la Gironde on 18 December 1899 and laid down the following month at their shipyard in Bordeaux. She was launched on 24 January 1894 and initially was commissioned for her sea trials on 6 February. These began two days later and revealed so many problems with her engines and boilers that Chanzy was decommissioned for repairs on 6 December. Recommissioned on 1 May 1895 to test the repairs, she entered service on 20 July.

The ship was initially assigned to the 1st Light Division of the Mediterranean Squadron before she was transferred to the 4th Light Division on 18 May 1896. Chanzy participated in the annual fleet maneuvers that summer before she was placed in reserve for repairs at Toulon in August. The ship began trials on 28 December 1896.

On 16 February 1897, Chanzy arrived off Crete to serve in the International Squadron, a multinational force made up of ships of the Austro-Hungarian Navy, French Navy, Imperial German Navy, Italian Royal Navy (Regia Marina), Imperial Russian Navy, and British Royal Navy that intervened in the 1897–1898 Greek uprising on Crete against rule by the Ottoman Empire. In early March 1897, she steamed with other ships of the squadron to Selino Kastelli on the southwest coast of Crete to put an international expedition ashore that rescued Ottoman troops and Cretan Turk civilians from Kandanos Although the International Squadron operated off Crete until December 1898, Chanzy departed Cretan waters on 25 February 1898 and returned to France. Upon arriving in France, she was assigned to the reserve squadron and did little for the rest of 1898 other than participate in the annual naval maneuvers.

On 1 January 1899 Chanzy was reassigned to the 1st Light Division and her most notable activities for the year were visits to the Balearic Islands and ports in the Aegean Sea and Middle East. Her main steam pipe fractured on 20 February and injured three crewmen. Chanzy was repaired in time to participate in the annual maneuvers and spent three weeks in September attached to the elderly gunnery ship Couronne before making a cruise to French North Africa. The ship began a brief deployment to the Levant on 1 February 1901 and returned on 4 April for the annual maneuvers before returning to the Levant on 30 October. She arrived back at Toulon on 1 February 1902 and began a long period of relative inactivity that lasted until she was formally placed in reserve when the new armored cruiser Marseillaise replaced her in the squadron in May 1904.

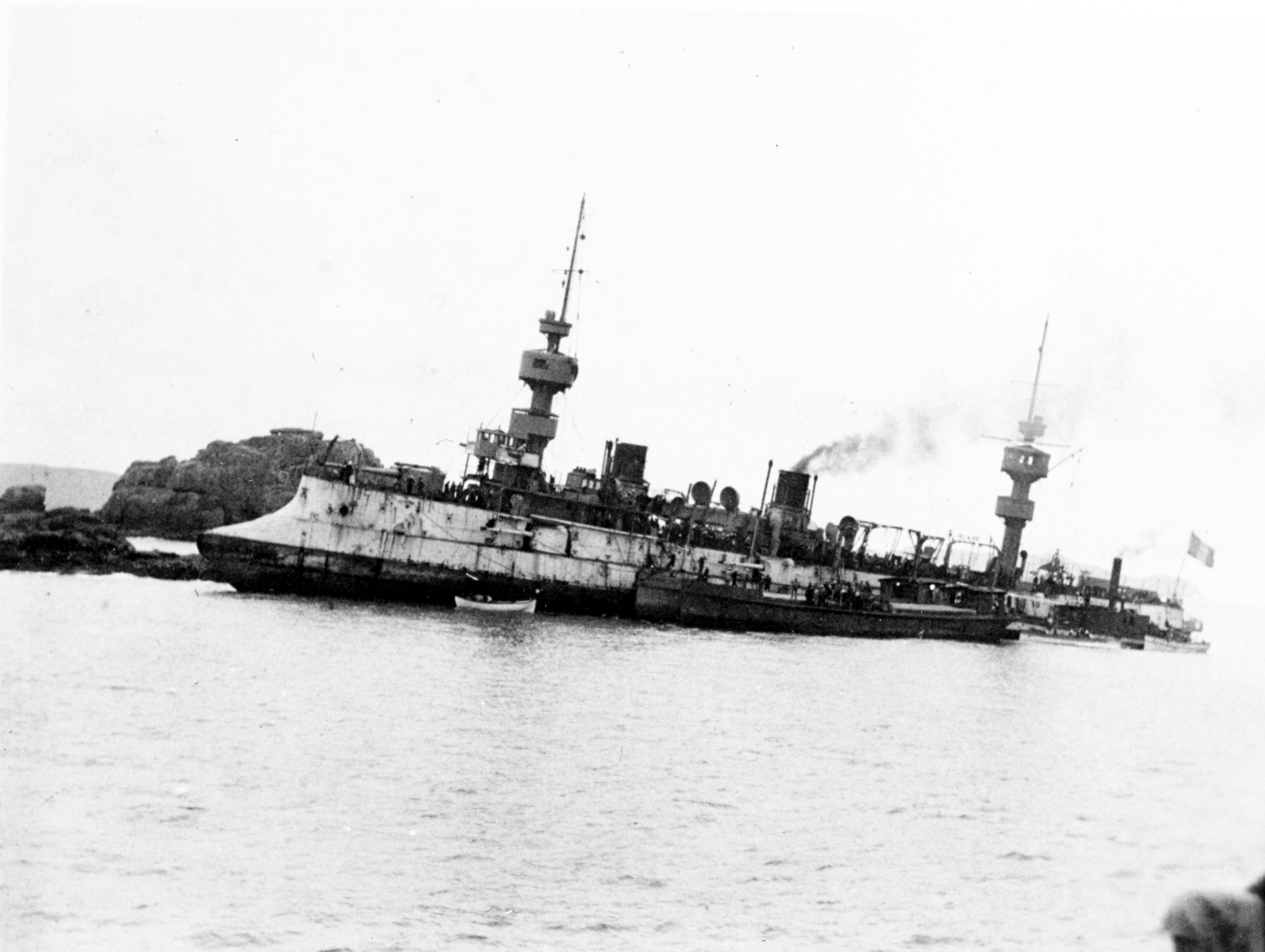
Chanzy after running aground, 30 May 1907

Chanzy was recommissioned on 15 September 1906 for service with the Far Eastern Squadron and departed on 15 November. She arrived at Saigon, French Indochina, on 10 January 1907 and visited Hong Kong and ports in China, and Japan in April and May. While departing from Shanghai on 20 May in thick fog, she ran aground on rocks off Ballard Island in the Chusan Islands. Her sister ship Bruix and the protected cruisers D'Entrecasteaux and Alger attempted to pull her off, but could not do so in the heavy seas. Her crew remained aboard attempting to get her off until they were evacuated without loss on 1 June when the ship began to founder and the wreck was demolished by the other cruisers on 12 June.

== Bibliography ==
- Feron, Luc (2014). "The Armoured Cruisers of the Amiral Charner Class". In Jordan, John (ed.). Warship 2014. London: Conway. ISBN 978-1-84486-236-8.
- Chesneau, Roger & Kolesnik, Eugene M., eds. (1979). Conway's All the World's Fighting Ships 1860–1905. Greenwich: Conway Maritime Press. ISBN 0-8317-0302-4.
- Jordan, John & Caresse, Philippe (2019). French Armoured Cruisers 1887–1932. Barnsley, UK: Seaforth Publishing. ISBN 978-1-5267-4118-9.
- "Naval Notes". Royal United Services Institution Journal. 52 (360). London: Royal United Services Institution: 259–60. February 1908.
- Silverstone, Paul H. (1984). Directory of the World's Capital Ships. New York: Hippocrene Books. ISBN 0-88254-979-0.
