= French cruiser Amiral Charner =

French Amiral Charner-class cruiser

Coordinates: 33°21′N 34°54′E

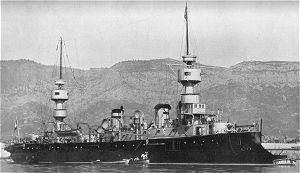
- Amiral Charner at anchor, c. 1897

History

France
- Name: Amiral Charner
- Namesake: Admiral Léonard Charner
- Builder: Arsenal de Rochefort
- Laid down: June 1889
- Launched: 18 March 1893
- Commissioned: 26 August 1895
- Fate: Sunk, 8 February 1916

General characteristics
- Class & type: Amiral Charner-class armored cruiser
- Displacement: 4,748 t (4,673 long tons)
- Length: 110.2 m (361 ft 7 in)
- Beam: 14.04 m (46 ft 1 in)
- Draught: 6.06 m (19 ft 11 in)
- Installed power: 16 × Belleville boilers; 8,300–9,000 PS (6,105–6,619 kW)
- Propulsion: 2 screws; 2 × triple-expansion steam engines
- Speed: 17 knots (31 km/h; 20 mph)
- Range: 4,000 nmi (7,400 km; 4,600 mi) at 10 knots (19 km/h; 12 mph)
- Complement: 16 officers and 378 enlisted men
- Armament: 2 × single 194 mm (7.6 in) guns; 6 × single 138 mm (5.4 in) guns; 4 × single 65 mm (2.6 in) guns; 4 × single 47 mm (1.9 in) Hotchkiss guns; 8 × single 37 mm (1.5 in) 5-barreled revolver guns; 4 × 450 mm (17.7 in) torpedo tubes
- Armour: Waterline belt: 60–90 mm (2.4–3.5 in); Deck: 40–50 mm (1.6–2.0 in); Gun turrets: 92 mm (3.6 in); Conning tower: 92 mm (3.6 in)

Amiral Charner was an armored cruiser built for the French Navy (Marine Navale) in the 1890s, the name ship of her class. She spent most of her career in the Mediterranean, although she was sent to China during the Boxer Rebellion of 1900–01. The ship was assigned to the International Squadron off the island of Crete during 1897-1898 revolt there and the Greco-Turkish War of 1897 to protect French interests and citizens. Amiral Charner spent most of the first decade of the 20th century as a training ship or in reserve. The ship was recommissioned when World War I began in 1914 and escorted convoys for several months before she was assigned to the Eastern Mediterranean to blockade the Ottoman-controlled coast. During this time, she helped to rescue several thousand Armenians from Syria during the Armenian genocide of 1915. Amiral Charner was sunk in early 1916 by a German submarine, with only a single survivor rescued.

== Design and description ==
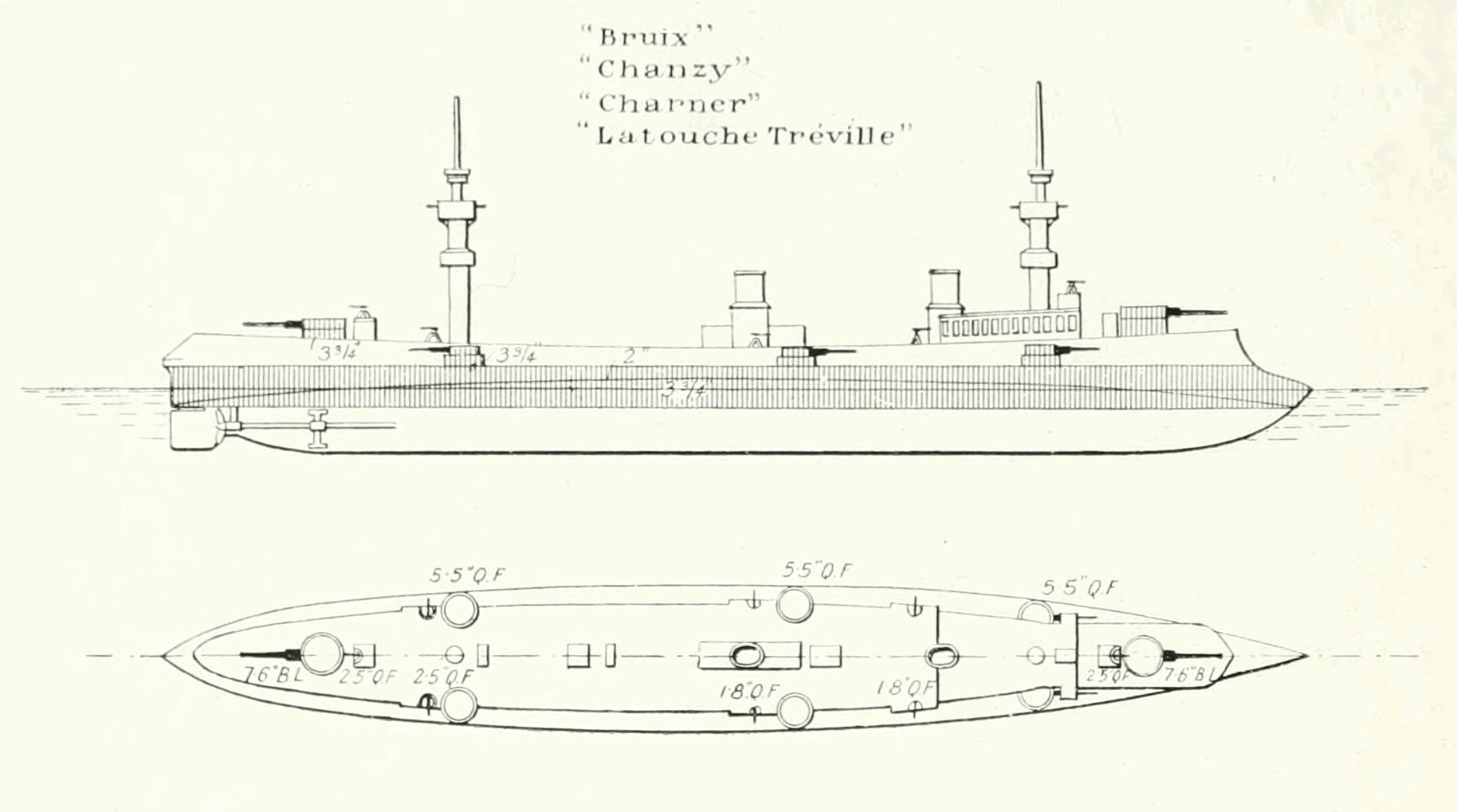
Line drawing from Brassey's Naval Annual 1902

The Amiral Charner-class ships were designed to be smaller and cheaper than the preceding armored cruiser design, the Dupuy de Lôme. Like the older ship, they were intended to fill the commerce-raiding strategy of the Jeune École.

The ship measured 106.12 meters (348 ft 2 in) between perpendiculars, with a beam of 14.04 meters (46 ft 1 in). Amiral Charner had a forward draft of 5.55 meters (18 ft 3 in) and drew 6.06 meters (19 ft 11 in) aft. She displaced 4,748 metric tons (4,673 long tons) at normal load and 4,990 metric tons (4,910 long tons) at deep load.

The Amiral Charner class had two triple-expansion steam engines, each driving a single propeller shaft. Steam for the engines was provided by 16 Belleville boilers and they were rated at a total of 8,300 metric horsepower (6,100 kW) using forced draught. Amiral Charner had a designed speed of 19 knots (35 km/h; 22 mph), but during sea trials on 18 July 1895 the engines produced 8,956 metric horsepower (6,587 kW), but only gave a maximum speed of 18.4 knots (34.1 km/h; 21.2 mph). The ship carried up to 535 metric tons (527 long tons; 590 short tons) of coal and could steam for 4,000 nautical miles (7,400 km; 4,600 mi) at a speed of 10 knots (19 km/h; 12 mph).

The ships of the Amiral Charner class had a main armament that consisted of two Canon de 194 mm Modèle 1887 guns that were mounted in single gun turrets, one each fore and aft of the superstructure. Their secondary armament comprised six Canon de 138.6 mm Modèle 1887 guns, each in single gun turrets on each broadside. For anti-torpedo boat defense, they carried four 65 mm (2.6 in) guns, four 47-millimeter (1.9 in) and eight 37-millimeter (1.5 in) five-barreled revolving Hotchkiss guns. They were also armed with four 450-millimeter (17.7 in) pivoting torpedo tubes; two mounted on each broadside above water.

The side of the Amiral Charner class was generally protected by 92 millimeters (3.6 in) of steel armor, from 1.3 meters (4 ft 3 in) below the waterline to 2.5 meters (8 ft 2 in) above it. The bottom 20 centimeters (7.9 in) tapered in thickness and the armor at the ends of the ships thinned to 60 millimeters (2.4 in). The curved protective deck of mild steel had a thickness of 40 millimeters (1.6 in) along its centerline that increased to 50 millimeters (2.0 in) at its outer edges. Protecting the boiler rooms, engine rooms, and magazines below it was a thin splinter deck. A watertight internal cofferdam, filled with cellulose, ran the length of the ship from the protective deck to a height of 1.2 meters (4 ft) above the waterline. Below the protective deck the ship was divided by 13 watertight transverse bulkheads with five more above it. The ship's conning tower and turrets were protected by 92 millimeters of armor.

== Construction and career ==
Amiral Charner, named after Admiral Léonard Charner, was laid down at the Arsenal de Rochefort with the name of Charner on 15 June 1889. She was launched on 18 March 1893 and renamed Amiral Charner on 25 March 1895 before she was commissioned on 26 August. The ship was initially assigned to the 2nd Light Division of the Mediterranean Squadron before she was briefly detached for service in the Eastern Mediterranean.

On 6 January 1896, Amiral Charner became the flagship of the Higher Naval War College (École supérieure de guerre de la marine), commanding her sister ship Latouche-Tréville and the protected cruiser Suchet. The mission of the school was to prepare officers for command at sea and for service on staffs. Ten months later, she was reassigned back to the active fleet on 20 October. The ship was sent to Crete on 10 February 1897 as part of the French contingent of the International Squadron deployed there during the Greco-Turkish War to protect Western interests and citizens and remained with the squadron until November 1898. Amiral Charner was reassigned to the college on 1 January 1899 together with the protected cruisers Friant and Davout. She was detached to the Northern Squadron (Escadre du Nord), based at Brest, for the first half of the year before returning to Toulon in late June. Three months later, the ship returned to Brest and was temporarily placed in reserve.

In January 1900 she was ordered to Rochefort for repairs to her steam-piping in preparation for her upcoming deployment to the Far East. Amiral Charner departed Brest on 26 June and arrived in Saigon, French Indochina, on 1 August. She supported Allied forces during the later stages of the Boxer Rebellion in mid-1901 before returning to Toulon on 8 November. After a brief refit, the ship was assigned to the 3rd Armored Division on 24 January 1902. During the annual naval maneuvers in July–August 1902, Amiral Charner simulated defending against a force breaking into the Mediterranean from the Atlantic, attacked the fortifications at Bizerte, French North Africa, and blockaded hostile ports. She was placed in reserve in Toulon on 15 January 1903 and later assigned to the gunnery school there until the middle of 1910. Amiral Charner became the guardship at Souda Bay, Crete on 13 May until relieved by her sister Bruix in July 1912 and was then refitted before being placed in reserve at Bizerta, Tunisia.

When World War I began in August 1914, she was recommissioned and assigned to escort convoys between Morocco and France together with Latouche-Tréville and Bruix. In November she was assigned to the 3rd Division of the 3rd Squadron based at Port Said, Egypt where she bombarded Ottoman positions on the Syrian coast several times. Amiral Charner ran aground under enemy fire off Dedeagatch, Bulgaria on 3 March 1915 and had to be pulled off by the small Italian cargo liner SS Bosnia. Together with the predreadnought battleship Jauréguiberry and the protected cruiser Destrées, she was assigned to blockade the coast between Tripoli, Lebanon and El Arish, Egypt in late August. On 11–12 September, the ship participated in the rescue of 3,000 Armenians north of the Orontes River Delta from pursuing Ottoman troops. The ship supported the occupation of the island of Kastelorizo on 28 December, along with the armored cruiser Jeanne d'Arc.

Sailing from Ruad Island, Syria to Port Said, Egypt, Amiral Charner was torpedoed by the German submarine U-21 on the morning of 8 February 1916. She sank in only two minutes with the loss of nearly the entire crew. Some 427 men were lost, with only a single survivor rescued five days later.

== Bibliography ==
- Chesneau, Roger & Kolesnik, Eugene M., eds. (1979). Conway's All the World's Fighting Ships 1860–1905. Greenwich: Conway Maritime Press. ISBN 0-8317-0302-4.
- Feron, Luc (2014). "The Armoured Cruisers of the Amiral Charner Class". In Jordan, John (ed.). Warship 2014. London: Conway. ISBN 978-1-84486-236-8.
- "French Naval Manoeuvres of 1902". Journal of the Royal United Service Institution. 46 (297). Royal United Services Institute: 1436–56. November 1902. doi:10.1080/03071840209416131.
- Jordan, John & Caresse, Philippe (2019). French Armoured Cruisers 1887–1932. Barnsley, UK: Seaforth Publishing. ISBN 978-1-5267-4118-9.
- "Naval and Military Notes". Journal of the Royal United Service Institution. XL (215). Royal United Services Institute: 69–91. January 1896.
- Silverstone, Paul H. (1984). Directory of the World's Capital Ships. New York: Hippocrene Books. ISBN 0-88254-979-0.
- Sondhaus, Lawrence (2014). The Great War at Sea: A Naval History of the First World War. Cambridge: Cambridge University Press. ISBN 978-1-107-03690-1.
