= Canon de 194 mm Modèle 1887 =

- Type: Naval gun
- Place of origin: France

Service history
- Used by: France
- Wars: World War I

Production history
- Designed: 1887

Specifications
- Mass: 10,770 kg (23,740 lb)
- Length: 8.076 m (26 ft 6 in)
- Barrel length: 7.76 m (25 ft 6 in) 45 caliber
- Shell: separate-loading, bagged charge and projectiles
- Shell weight: 75–90 kg (165–198 lb)
- Caliber: 194 mm (7.6 in)
- Elevation: Dupuy de Lôme: -5°/ +15° Amiral Charner: -6° / +14.2°
- Traverse: Bow/Stern: -150° / +150°
- Rate of fire: 1 rpm
- Muzzle velocity: 770–800 m/s (2,500–2,600 ft/s)
- Effective firing range: 11.5 km (7 mi)

The Canon de 194 mm Modèle 1887 was a turret mounted medium-caliber naval gun used as the main armament of a number of armored cruisers of the French Navy during World War I.

== Design ==
The Mle 1887 guns were typical built-up guns of the period with a rifled steel liner and several layers of steel reinforcing hoops. The guns used an interrupted screw breech and the new smokeless powder of the period.

== Naval service ==
Ships that carried the Mle 1887 include:

- Dupuy de Lôme - This armored cruiser had a main armament of two Mle 1887 guns in single turrets fore and aft.
- Amiral Charner-class cruisers - This class of four armored cruisers had a main armament of two Mle 1887 guns in single turrets fore and aft.

== Ammunition ==
The Mle 1893-1896 used separate-loading ammunition with two bagged charges weighing 18.8 kg (41 lb).

Shell type	Weight
Armor-piercing, capped	90 kg (200 lb)
Common shell	75 kg (165 lb)
Semi-armor-piercing, capped	89.5 kg (197 lb)
