= French cruiser Dupuy de Lôme =

French armoured cruiser

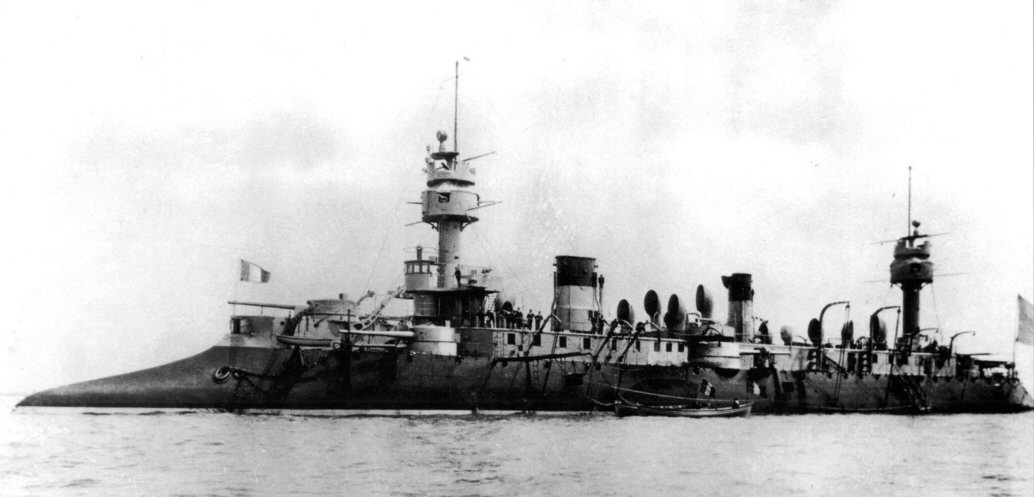
- Dupuy de Lôme

History

France
- Name: Dupuy de Lôme
- Namesake: Henri Dupuy de Lôme
- Builder: Arsenal de Brest, Brest, France
- Laid down: 4 July 1888
- Launched: 27 October 1890
- Commissioned: 15 May 1895
- Decommissioned: 20 March 1910
- Renamed: Commandante Aguirre, 1912; Péruvier, 1920
- Fate: Sold to Peru, 12 September 1912. Never delivered.; Sold October 1918 and converted as cargo ship.; Broken up, 1923

General characteristics (as completed)
- Type: Armoured cruiser
- Displacement: 6,301 tonnes (6,201 long tons)
- Length: 114 m (374 ft 0.2 in) (pp)
- Beam: 15.7 m (51 ft 6.1 in)
- Draught: 7.07 m (23 ft 2.3 in) (mean)
- Installed power: 11 Amirauté fire-tube boilers; 14,000 metric horsepower (10,297 kW)
- Propulsion: 3 shafts; 3 triple expansion engines
- Speed: 20 knots (37 km/h; 23 mph) (designed)
- Range: 4,000 nmi (7,400 km; 4,600 mi) at 12.5 knots (23.2 km/h; 14.4 mph)
- Complement: 521
- Armament: 2 × single 194 mm (7.6 in) guns; 6 × single 164 mm (6.4 in) guns; 4 × single 65 mm (2.6 in) guns; 10 × single 47 mm (1.9 in) guns; 4 × single 37 mm (1.5 in) guns; 4 × 450 mm (17.7 in) torpedo tubes
- Armour: Belt: 100 mm (3.9 in); Deck: 30 mm (1.2 in); Conning tower: 125 mm (5 in); Gun turrets: 100 mm (4 in)

Dupuy de Lôme was an armoured cruiser built for the French Navy (Marine Nationale) during the late 1880s and 1890s. She is considered by some to be the world's first armoured cruiser and was intended to attack enemy merchant ships. The ship was named after the naval architect Henri Dupuy de Lôme. Dupuy de Lôme's completion was delayed by almost two years by problems with her boilers, but she was finally commissioned in 1895 and assigned to the Northern Squadron (Escadre du Nord), based at Brest, for most of her career. The ship made a number of visits to foreign ports before she began a lengthy reconstruction in 1902. By the time this was completed in 1906, the cruiser was regarded as obsolete and Dupuy de Lôme was placed in reserve, aside from one assignment in Morocco.

The ship was sold to the Peruvian Navy in 1912, but they never paid the last two installments and the ship remained inactive at Brest during World War I. The French agreed to take the ship back in 1917, keeping the money already paid, and they sold her in 1918 to a Belgian shipping company that converted her into a freighter. Renamed Péruvier, the ship's engines broke down during her maiden voyage as a merchant vessel in 1920 and she had to be towed to her destination, whereupon part of her cargo of coal was discovered to be on fire. Deemed uneconomical to repair, Péruvier was towed to Antwerp and later scrapped in 1923.

== Design and description ==
Dupuy de Lôme was designed to fill the commerce-raiding strategy of the Jeune École naval theory. Considered by some the first true armoured cruiser (as the type is understood in its sailless turn-of-the-century form, compared with earlier steam-and-sail cruising ships with armour), she was superior to existing British and Italian protected cruisers, especially in her relatively thick and very extensive steel armour. She could exert significant control over the engagement range with her high speed and her heavy armament of quick-firing guns, all of which were of very modern high-velocity type and were mounted in gun turrets, in marked contrast to her intended opponents who mounted their guns in lightly protected casemates or pivot mounts.

The ship measured 114 metres (374 ft 0 in) between perpendiculars, with a beam of 15.7 metres (51 ft 6 in). Dupuy de Lôme had a mean draught of 7.07 metres (23 ft 2 in) and displaced 6,301 tonnes (6,201 long tons) at normal load. At deep load, she displaced 6,682 tonnes (6,576 long tons) and had a metacentric height of only 0.695 metres (2 ft 3.4 in). This gave the ship a long, slow roll, making her a steady gunnery platform. Her long, cut-away bow resembled a spur-type ram, but was not armoured. It was reduced in profile to reduce blast damage when the forward guns were fired. Dupuy de Lôme was fitted with two large military masts.

She had three triple-expansion steam engines, a vertical type for the centre shaft and horizontal types for the outboard shafts. Each engine drove a single propeller shaft, with propellers 4.2 metres (13 ft 9 in) in diameter on the outboard shaft and a 4.4-metre (14 ft 5 in) propeller on the centre shaft. Steam for the engines was provided by 11 Amirauté fire-tube boilers and they were rated at a total of 14,000 metric horsepower (10,000 kW). The ship had a designed speed of 20 knots (37 km/h; 23 mph), but during sea trials on 2 April 1895 the engines only produced 13,186 metric horsepower (9,698 kW) that gave a maximum speed of 19.73 knots (36.54 km/h; 22.70 mph). Dupuy de Lôme carried up to 1,080 tonnes (1,060 long tons; 1,190 short tons) of coal and could steam for 4,000 nautical miles (7,400 km; 4,600 mi) at a speed of 12.5 knots (23.2 km/h; 14.4 mph).

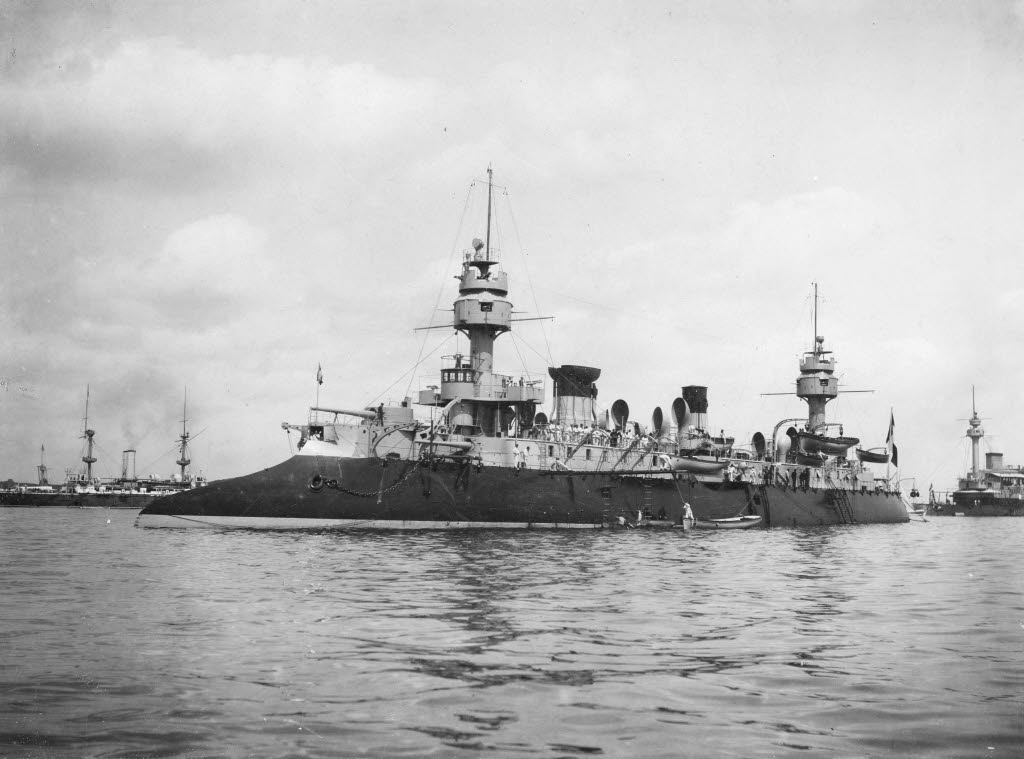
Dupy de Lôme at the opening of the Kiel Canal in 1895

Dupuy de Lôme's main armament consisted of two 45-calibre Canon de 194 mm Modèle 1887 guns that were mounted in single gun turrets, one on each broadside amidships. Her secondary armament comprised six 45-calibre Canon de 164 mm Modèle 1887 guns, three each in single gun turrets at the bow and stern. The three turrets at the stern were all on the upper deck and could interfere with each other. For anti-torpedo boat defence, she carried ten 47-millimetre (1.9 in) and four 37-millimetre (1.5 in) Hotchkiss guns. She was also armed with four 450-millimetre (17.7 in) pivoting torpedo tubes; two mounted on each broadside above water.

The whole side of the ship was protected by 100 millimetres (3.9 in) of steel armour, from the bottom edge of the protective deck 1.38 metres (4 ft 6 in) below the waterline to the edge of the weather deck. The curved protective deck had a total thickness of 30 millimetres (1.2 in) and did not rise above the ship's waterline. Protecting the boiler rooms, engine rooms, and magazines below it was a splinter deck 8 millimetres (0.31 in) thick. The space between the protective and splinter decks could be filled with coal to increase the effective thickness of the ship's armour. It was very cramped there and the coal was very difficult to access. A watertight internal cofferdam, filled with cellulose, ran the length of Dupuy de Lôme from the protective deck to a height of 1 metre (3 ft 3 in) above the waterline. Below the protective deck the ship was divided by 13 watertight transverse bulkheads with three more above the protective deck. The ship's conning tower was protected by 125 mm (4.9 in) and her turrets by 100 mm of armour.

== Service ==
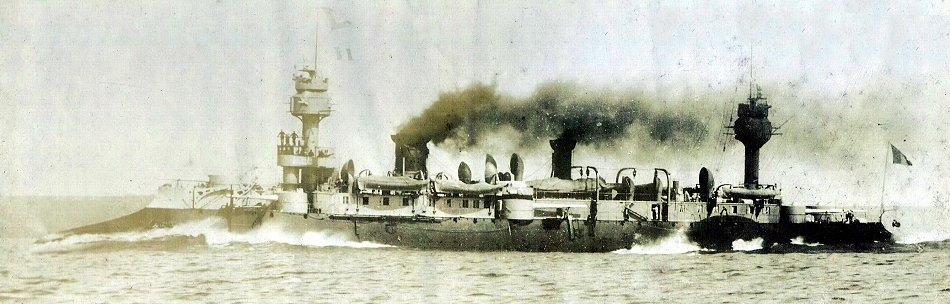
Dupuy de Lôme before her 1902 refit

Dupuy de Lôme was laid down at the Brest shipyard on 4 July 1888 and launched on 27 October 1890. A number of her forged steel armour plates proved to be defective during tests as the metallurgical techniques to harden it were still under development, but most plates were accepted anyway. The ship was commissioned for preliminary sea trials on 1 April 1892 and one boiler tube burst on 20 June, burning 16 men. The necessary modifications to fix the problem delayed the ship's completion by almost a year. Further testing in October 1893 showed that Dupuy de Lôme's engines could only attain 10,180 metric horsepower (7,490 kW) during a 24-hour trial and that the boilers were structurally unsound. The manufacturer agreed to replace them, but the necessary work delayed the ship's completion by another year. She was commissioned again for a new set of sea trials on 15 November 1894 and proved reasonably satisfactory.

Dupuy de Lôme was finally commissioned on 15 May 1895 and was assigned to the Northern Squadron, based on the Atlantic coast. She represented France, together with the ironclad Hoche and the cruiser Surcouf, during the opening ceremony for the Kiel Canal the following month. She made port visits in Spain in June 1896 and escorted the Russian Imperial yacht into Cherbourg when Nicholas II of Russia began a state visit on 5 October. The ship escorted the President of France, Félix Faure, when he visited Russia in April 1897. Bilge keels were fitted during a brief refit that began in October and effectively reduced the ship's roll by half. In June 1899, Dupuy de Lôme visited ports in Spain and Portugal and she represented France at Spithead during Queen Victoria's funeral in January–February 1901.

The ship began an extensive reconstruction in 1902 at Brest, with the installation of 20 new Guyot–du-Temple water-tube boilers, that took four years to complete. The boilers had an operating pressure of 11.25 kg/cm^{2} (1,103 kPa; 160 psi) and they required that a third funnel be added which necessitated extensive structural modifications. The rear military mast was replaced by a simple pole mast and sea trials in July 1906 showed that the ship could only attain 18.27 knots (33.84 km/h; 21.02 mph) from 12,887 metric horsepower (9,478 kW). Dupuy de Lôme was placed in reserve after completing her refit in October 1906 and was not recommissioned until September 1908 for service on the Moroccan station. By this time many of the ship's plates were rusting and her entire water distribution system had to be dismantled for cleaning in 1909. Later that year, she was placed into reserve again and deemed uneconomical to repair. Dupuy de Lôme was decommissioned on 20 March 1910, but the final decision to strike her from the Navy List was not made until 20 February 1911.

Prompted by the rumoured purchase of the small Italian protected cruiser Umbria by Ecuador in 1910, Peru offered to buy a French armoured cruiser. A price of three million francs was agreed upon, to be paid in three instalments, and Peru agreed to reimburse France for the costs of repairing Dupuy de Lôme. These repairs were completed by 6 March 1912 and the ship was formally transferred to the Peruvian Navy and renamed Comandante Aguirre after the first instalment was paid. After Umbria was bought by Haiti instead of Ecuador, the Peruvians lost interest in completing the purchase and the ship was left in the care of the French in October 1914. Proposals to use her during World War I were rejected as she was thought to be too obsolete to be worth refitting. On 17 January 1917 the ship was officially returned to France and the money already paid was put against the cost to repair Comandante Aguirre. Any money in excess of the estimated 400,000 francs that her scrapping would bring would be turned over to Peru.

In October 1918, she was sold to the Belgian firm of Lloyd Royal Belge (LRB) and converted to a freighter under the name Péruvier by Forges et Chantiers de la Gironde. A conventional bow was built up over her pseudo-ram and the space was used to accommodate her crew. The two outboard engines, their associated boilers and propeller shafts were removed as were the two forward funnels. The ship's side and deck armour was removed wherever it did not compromise structural strength. Péruvier was delivered in December 1919 and she began her first voyage carrying 5,000 tonnes (4,900 long tons) of coal from Cardiff to Rio de Janeiro on 20 January 1920. Engine repairs had to be made at Falmouth the next day and were not completed until 14 February. Her engine broke down again in the mid-Atlantic and she was towed to Las Palmas by a Spanish merchantman. Arriving there on 20 March, she was towed by another LRB ship to Pernambuco. After her arrival there on 1 June, the coal in her No. 3 hold was found to be on fire. This was not extinguished until 19 June and the ship remained in harbour until 14 October. Péruvier was towed to Antwerp, arriving on 18 November, and lay idle there until she was sold for scrap. On 4 March 1923, she was towed to the shipbreakers in Flushing.
