= Jeune École =

French naval strategy

The Jeune École ("Young School") was a strategic naval concept developed during the 19th century. It advocated the use of small, heavily armed vessels to combat larger battleships, and the use of commerce raiders to cripple the trade of the rival nation. The idea was developed among French naval theorists: the French government had the second largest navy of the time, and the theorists desired to counteract the strength of the larger British Royal Navy.

== Small units against battleships ==
One of the first proponents of the Jeune École was the artillery general Henri-Joseph Paixhans, who invented explosive shell guns for warships during the 1820s. He advocated the use of these powerful guns on numerous small steam warships that could destroy much larger battleships.

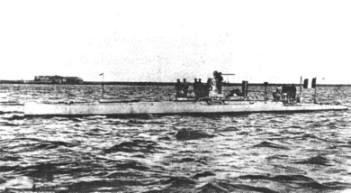
The 1900 French submarine Narval

Later, the French Navy developed the concept more elaborately as it experimented with torpedoes and torpedo boats. The French Navy became one of the strongest proponents of this combat system by the end of the 19th century, particularly during the ministry of Admiral Théophile Aube. The naval successes of the French Navy against China during the Sino-French War of 1883–1885 also tended to validate the potential of torpedo boats against conventional navies.

France was also very active in the development of a submarine fleet, again trying to rely on technical development to compensate for British numerical superiority of battleships. By the beginning of the 20th century, France was "undoubtedly the first navy to have an effective submarine force".

Counter measures against the Jeune École system consisted largely of destroyers, designed to deter and destroy small torpedo units (in French, "destroyer" is contre-torpilleur, and in English, "destroyer" is a contraction of "torpedo boat destroyer"), the first of which was the Destructor.

== Commerce raiders ==
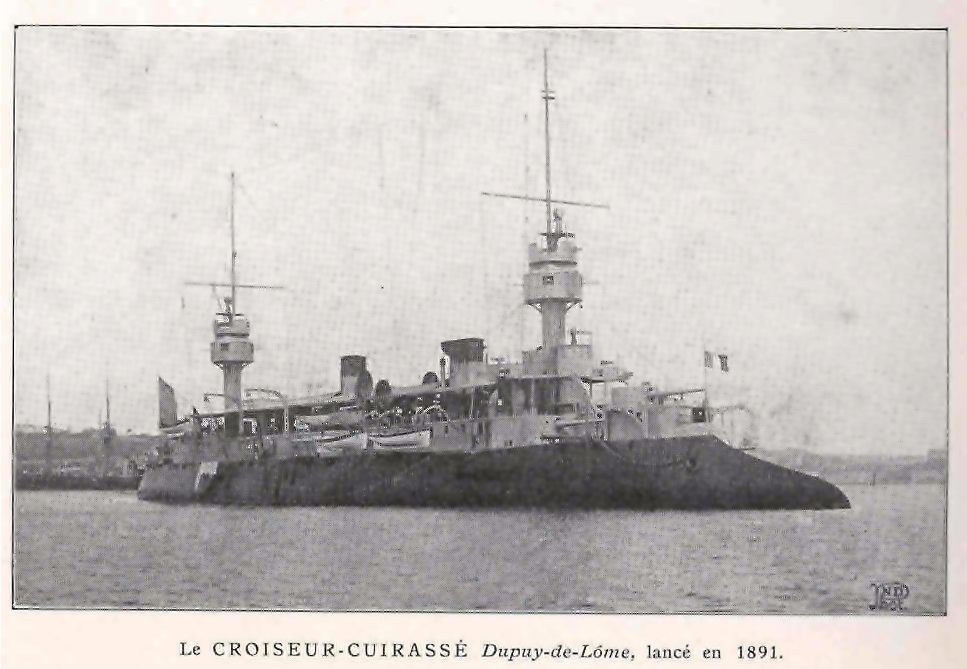
Dupuy de Lôme, an early armored cruiser.

The other constitutive part of the Jeune École concept consisted of planning to raid the commercial ships of the enemy so as to curtail its trade and economy, again a tactic designed especially against Great Britain.

Raiding ships, such as the Dupuy de Lôme, were designed for this role. Dupuy de Lôme, an armored cruiser laid down in 1888, was capable of 23 knots and was designed to raid enemy commerce ships during extended forays.

== Influences ==
The Jeune École system was particularly influential on the development of smaller navies, including the Imperial Japanese Navy during the 19th century, which tried to compensate for weaknesses in battleships. Aidan Clarke, of the Center for International Maritime Security (CIMSEC), wrote in 2018 that "[Jeune École] tactics were perfect for the young Japanese Navy [in the First Sino-Japanese War]. The Battle off the Yalu should be viewed as a textbook example of the Jeune Ecole in use against a quantitatively superior fleet."

British admiral "Jackie" Fisher, who would later become the First Sea Lord in 1904, was especially impressed by the ideas of Jeune École and felt that the threats of fast raiders and swarms of torpedo boats made the traditional battleship too unwieldy. He argued that the future lay with fast ships with light armor and big guns, which would become known as the battlecruiser.

== See also ==
- Gabriel Charmes
