= French cruiser Isly =

Protected cruiser of the French Navy

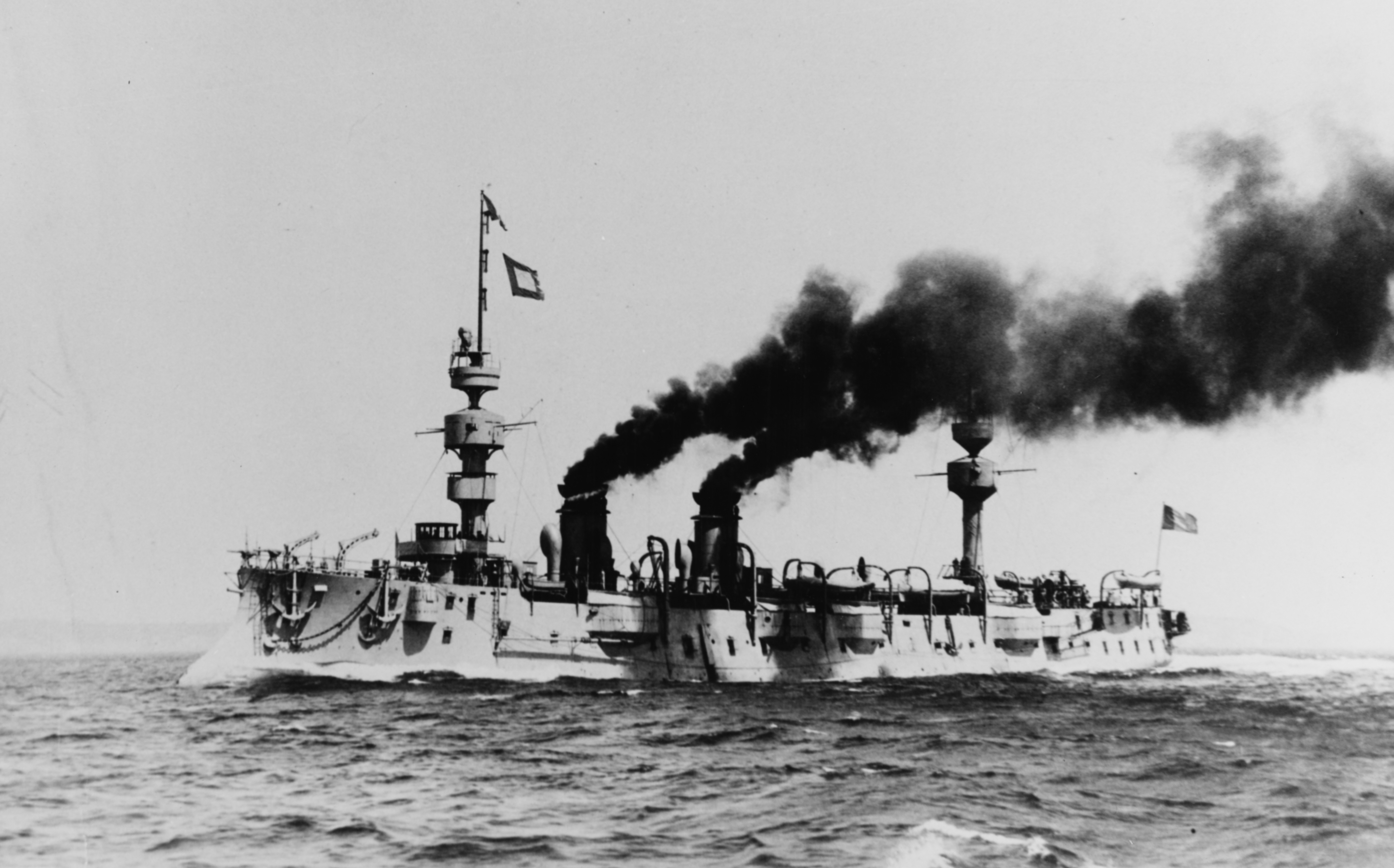
- Isly underway, c. 1894

History

France
- Name: Isly
- Ordered: 1 March 1887
- Builder: Arsenal de Brest
- Laid down: 3 July 1887
- Launched: 22 June 1891
- Commissioned: 25 October 1892
- Decommissioned: 13 March 1911
- In service: 20 September 1893
- Stricken: 23 November 1911
- Fate: Broken up, 1914

General characteristics
- Class & type: Jean Bart-class cruiser
- Displacement: Normal: 4,165 t (4,099 long tons; 4,591 short tons); Full load: 4,300 t (4,200 long tons; 4,700 short tons)
- Length: 109.6 m (359 ft 7 in) long overall
- Beam: 13.3 m (43 ft 8 in)
- Draft: 6.05 m (19 ft 10 in)
- Installed power: 8 × fire-tube boilers; 8,100 indicated horsepower (6,000 kW)
- Propulsion: 2 × triple-expansion engines; 2 × screw propellers
- Speed: 19 knots (35 km/h; 22 mph)
- Range: 7,014 nmi (12,990 km; 8,072 mi) at 10 knots (19 km/h; 12 mph)
- Complement: 331–405
- Armament: 4 × 164.7 mm (6.48 in) guns; 6 × 138.6 mm (5.46 in) guns; 6 × 47 mm (1.9 in) guns; 8 × 37 mm (1.5 in) Hotchkiss revolver cannon; 5 × 356 mm (14 in) torpedo tubes
- Armor: Deck: 40 to 90 mm (1.6 to 3.5 in); Conning tower: 120 mm (4.7 in); Gun shields: 54 mm (2.1 in)

Isly was a Jean Bart-class protected cruiser built in the late 1880s and early 1890s for the French Navy. The second and final member of the class, Isly and her sister ship were ordered during the tenure of Admiral Théophile Aube as Minister of Marine according to the theories of the Jeune École doctrine. The ships were intended as long-range commerce raiders, and they were armed with a main battery of four 164 mm (6.5 in) guns, were protected by an armor deck that was 50 to 100 mm (2 to 4 in) thick, and were capable of steaming at a top speed of around 19 knots (35 km/h; 22 mph).

Isly initially served with the Reserve Division of the Northern Squadron, spending only part of the year in active service for training exercises. She was deployed to French Indochina from 1895 to 1896 and then again from 1897 to 1899. After returning to France, she joined the North Atlantic station, operating out of Brest. Isly spent the next decade serving in the Atlantic, changing units as the fleet was repeatedly reorganized; she also received new water-tube boilers in 1902. In 1908, she was briefly sent to French Morocco, and the following year she was converted into a depot ship for destroyers. She was struck from the naval register in 1914 and thereafter broken up.

== Design ==
Plan and profile drawing of the Jean Bart class

Design work on the Jean Bart class (Note: A similar cruiser, Alger, that was built at the same time is sometimes considered to be part of the class, which is sometimes referred to as the Alger class. The ships were built to different designs and differed in their particulars significantly.) began in 1885 under the direction of the French naval minister, Charles-Eugène Galiber, who wanted a new commerce raiding protected cruiser similar to the earlier Amiral Cécille, albeit smaller and with a smaller secondary battery. By the time French shipyards had responded to requests for design proposals, Admiral Théophile Aube had replaced Galiber as naval minister, but Aube was an ardent supporter of the Jeune École doctrine that emphasized long-range, commerce raiding cruisers. He called for the construction of six large and ten small protected cruisers, though by the end of his tenure in 1887, the program had been reduced to five large, two medium, and six small cruisers. Aube ordered the first two Jean Bart-class cruisers to fulfill the requirements for the first set of large cruisers, and his successor, Édouard Barbey, authorized the third. (Note: The second of the three, to have been named Dupuy de Lôme, was cancelled before work began, leaving just two ships in the class.) The two Jean Barts proved to be the last of the initial series of commerce raiders built under the influence of the Jeune École.

Isly was 105 m (344 ft 6 in) long between perpendiculars, with a beam of 12.98 m (42 ft 7 in) and a draft of 6.10 to 6.45 m (20 ft 0 in to 21 ft 2 in). She displaced 4,406 long tons (4,477 t). Her crew varied over the course of her career, amounting to 387–405 officers and enlisted men. The ship's propulsion system consisted of a pair of triple-expansion steam engines driving two screw propellers. Steam was provided by eight coal-burning fire-tube boilers that were ducted into two funnels. Her machinery was rated to produce 8,000 indicated horsepower (6,000 kW) for a top speed of 19 to 19.5 knots (35.2 to 36.1 km/h; 21.9 to 22.4 mph). She had a cruising radius of 3,200 nautical miles (5,900 km; 3,700 mi) at 10 knots (19 km/h; 12 mph).

The ship was armed with a main battery of four 164.7 mm (6.48 in) 28-caliber guns and a secondary battery of six 138.6 mm (5.46 in) 30-cal. guns. All of these guns were placed in individual pivot mounts; the 164 mm guns were in sponsons located fore and aft, with two guns per broadside. Four of the 138 mm guns were in sponsons between the 164 mm guns, one was in an embrasure in the forecastle and the last was in a swivel mount on the stern. For close-range defense against torpedo boats, she carried six 47 mm (1.9 in) 3-pounder Hotchkiss guns and eight 37 mm (1.5 in) Hotchkiss revolver cannon. She was also armed with five 356 mm (14 in) torpedo tubes in her hull above the waterline. Armor protection consisted of a curved armor deck that was 40 to 90 mm (2 to 4 in) thick, along with 120 mm (5 in) plating on the conning tower. The main and secondary guns received 54 mm (2.1 in) thick gun shields.

=== Modifications ===
In 1897, Isly had her heavy military masts replaced with light pole masts in an attempt to reduce topweight. At that time, she also had her bow and stern torpedo tubes removed. Another refit took place in 1909, during which her light armament was standardized to twelve 47 mm guns. The navy considered replacing her boilers in 1910, but decided against it due to the cost.

== Service history ==
Isly was ordered on 1 March 1887 and she was laid down at the Arsenal de Brest in Brest, France on 3 July 1887, before the lead ship of her class, Jean Bart, began construction. She was launched on 22 June 1891 and was commissioned on 25 October 1892 to begin sea trials. During her initial testing, she reached a top speed of 18.5 knots (34.3 km/h; 21.3 mph) using forced draft, though the test was conducted in poor weather that reduced the ship's speed by about half a knot. The trials lasted nearly a year, and she was finally placed in full commission for active service on 20 September 1893. Ten days later, she steamed to Cherbourg to join the Escadre du Nord (Northern Squadron). She was assigned to the Reserve Division of the Northern Squadron, which that time included the ironclad Suffren, the coastal defense ships Tonnerre and Fulminant, and the torpedo cruiser Epervier.

The following year, she continued to operate with the squadron. She took part in annual training exercises that year to evaluate the effectiveness of the French coastal defense system. The squadron went to sea on 15 July and began the operations the next day, which lasted until 29 July. The maneuvers demonstrated the usefulness of torpedo boat flotillas in coastal defense, but highlighted that France's coastal defense system in the English Channel was not yet complete. Isly was sent with the cruiser Alger on a cruise to French Indochina in 1895; at that time, the unit also included the cruisers Duguay-Trouin, Forfait, and Beautemps-Beaupré. In the immediate aftermath of the Chinese defeat in the First Sino-Japanese War in May 1895, the French sent Alger, Isly, and Beautemps-Beaupré up the Yangtze River to Nanking to demand that previous agreements regarding protection of French missionaries in the country be enforced. The ships arrived in the city on 29 June, but later that day, Beautemps-Beaupré received orders via telegram to depart immediately for Callao, Peru. Alger and Isly remained in the city for several days as negotiations took place. The Chinese eventually agreed to meet French demands, and the two cruisers exchanged salutes with the Chinese cruiser Nan Chen. Isly remained on station in the Far East into 1896, but was ordered home that year. In 1897, Isly returned to the Far East in company with the recently completed protected cruiser Descartes; they joined the old ironclad Bayard and the unprotected cruiser Éclaireur.

Isly had returned to France by 1899, when she was assigned to the North Atlantic station in Brest on 15 March. The ship was laid up in 1900 for an overhaul that included the replacement of her original wood decks with linoleum-covered steel. She remained out of service through early 1901 and was recommissioned on 8 April for service in the fisheries in the Atlantic. She was assigned to the Naval Division of the Atlantic Ocean, along with the protected cruisers Suchet and Amiral Cécille. Isly operated with the transport vessel Manche, patrolling the fishing grounds off Newfoundland for six months of the year. The next year, Isly was decommissioned for a major overhaul, which included the installation of new water-tube boilers.

In 1908, the Naval Division of the Atlantic was amalgamated with the Northern Squadron, and Isly was transferred to that command, commissioning for service on 1 January in Lorient. By that time, the squadron consisted of eight armored cruisers and four other protected cruisers. Isly was temporarily sent to French Morocco early in the year in company with the armored cruiser Kléber. In 1909, Isly was converted into a depot ship for destroyers, before being decommissioned on 13 March 1911. She was struck from the naval register on 23 November 1911 and used as a depot ship for torpedo boats based in Lorient from late 1911 to 1913. She was then placed for sale, eventually being purchased on 11 April 1914 by Willer Peterson of Copenhagen, Denmark, to be broken up.
