= Jean Bart-class cruiser =

Protected cruiser class of the French Navy

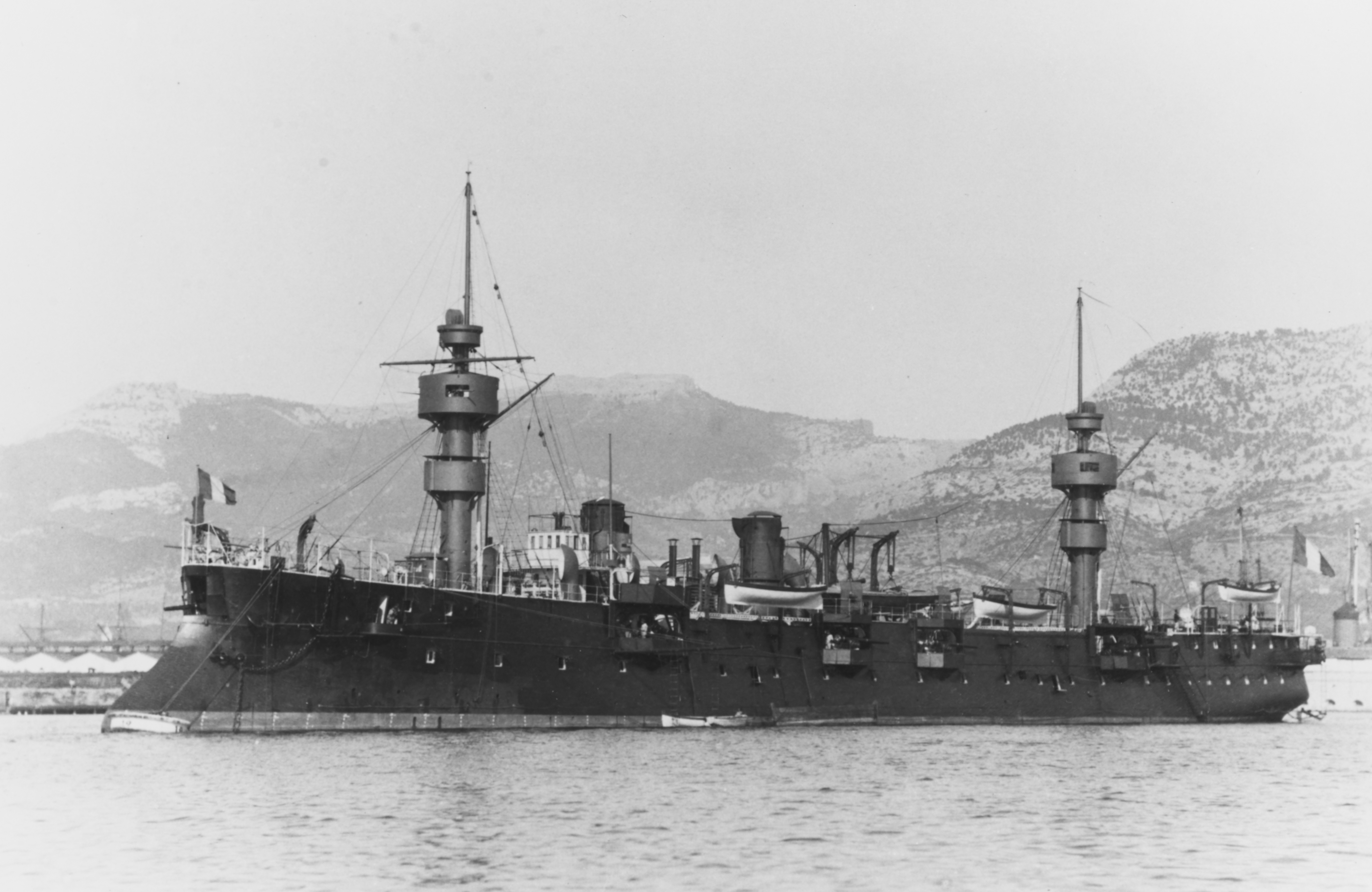
- Jean Bart early in her career

Class overview
- Name: Jean Bart class
- Builders: Arsenal de Rochefort; Arsenal de Brest
- Operators: French Navy
- Preceded by: Troude class
- Succeeded by: Alger
- Built: 1887–1893
- In commission: 1891–1914
- Completed: 2
- Lost: 1
- Retired: 1

General characteristics
- Type: Protected cruiser
- Displacement: Normal: 4,165 t (4,099 long tons; 4,591 short tons); Full load: 4,436 t (4,366 long tons; 4,890 short tons)
- Length: 109.6 m (359 ft 7 in) long overall
- Beam: 13.3 m (43 ft 8 in)
- Draft: 6.05 m (19 ft 10 in)
- Installed power: 8 × fire-tube boilers; 8,100 indicated horsepower (6,000 kW)
- Propulsion: 2 × triple-expansion engines; 2 × screw propellers
- Speed: 19 knots (35 km/h; 22 mph)
- Range: 7,014 nmi (12,990 km; 8,072 mi) at 10 knots (19 km/h; 12 mph)
- Complement: 331–405
- Armament: 4 × 164.7 mm (6.48 in) guns; 6 × 138.6 mm (5.46 in) guns; 2 × 65 mm (2.6 in) 9-pounder guns; 6 × 47 mm (1.9 in) guns; 8 × 37 mm (1.5 in) Hotchkiss revolver cannon; 5 × 356 mm (14 in) torpedo tubes
- Armor: Deck: 40 to 90 mm (1.6 to 3.5 in); Conning tower: 80 mm (3.1 in); Gun shields: 54 mm (2.1 in)

The Jean Bart class comprised two protected cruisers of the French Navy built in the late 1880s and early 1890s; the two ships were Jean Bart and Isly. They were ordered as part of a fleet program that accorded with the theories of the Jeune École, which proposed a fleet based on cruisers and torpedo boats to defend France. The Jean Bart-class cruisers were intended to serve a long-range commerce raiders to attack enemy merchant shipping. The ships were armed with a main battery of four 164 mm (6.5 in) guns supported by six 138 mm (5.4 in) guns and they had a top speed of 19 to 19.5 knots (35.2 to 36.1 km/h; 21.9 to 22.4 mph).

After entering service, Isly was assigned to the Northern Squadron, while Jean Bart operated with the Mediterranean Squadron until 1895, when she, too, joined the Northern Squadron. That year, Isly was sent to French Indochina, and they were followed by Jean Bart followed in 1898. Jean Bart was present in the Far East during the Boxer Uprising in Qing China the following year, by which time Isly had been transferred to the North Atlantic station. Jean Bart was wrecked off the coast of the Western Sahara in 1907 and could not be refloated. Isly was converted into a depot ship in 1909 before being sold to ship breakers in 1914.

== Design ==
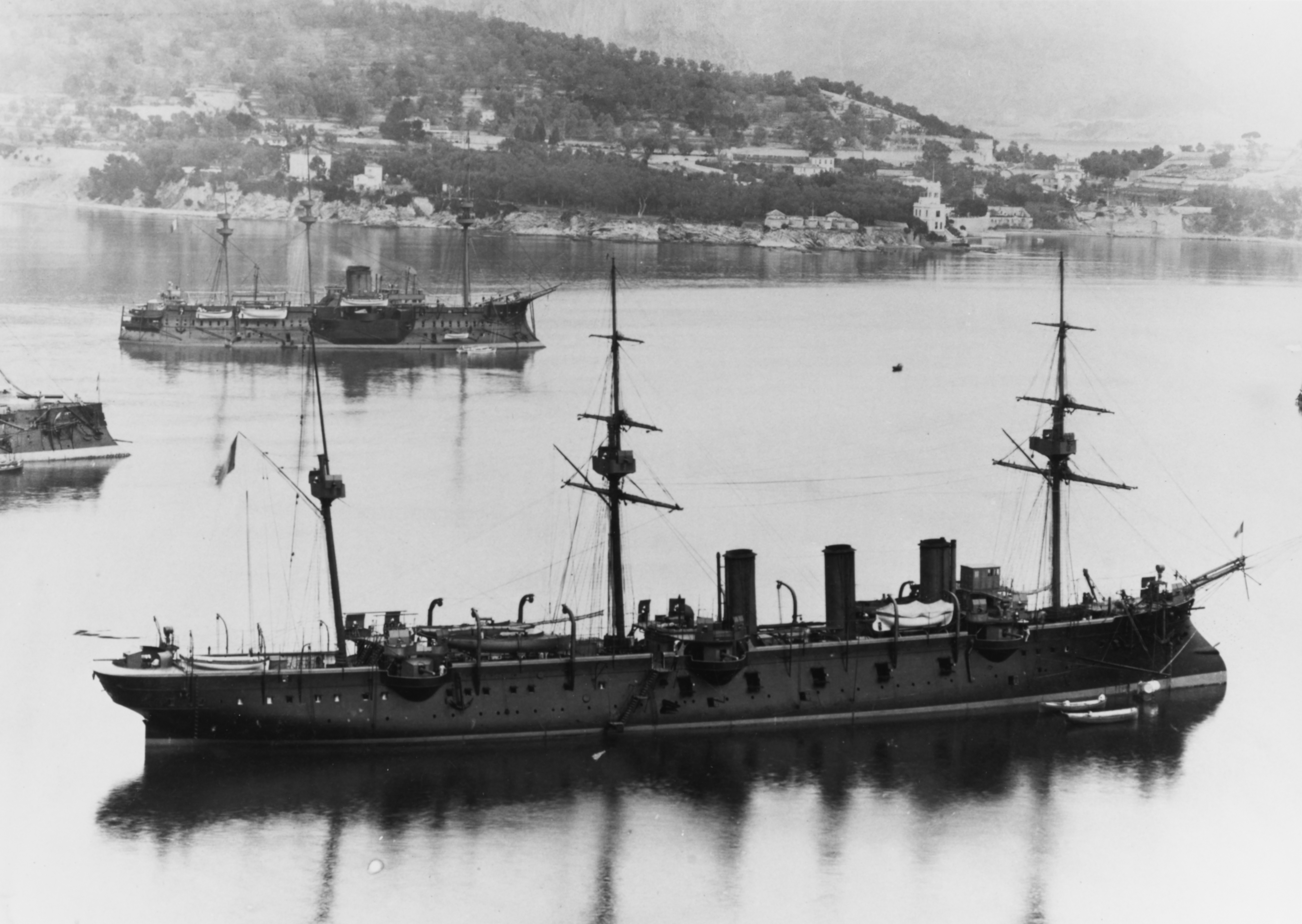
Amiral Cécille, the predecessor to the Jean Bart design

The French naval minister, Charles-Eugène Galiber, drew up specifications for a new commerce raiding cruiser in mid-1885, which he submitted to the Conseil des Travaux (Council of Works) for consideration on 12 June. The new ship was to generally follow the pattern of the earlier cruiser Amiral Cécille, but slightly smaller and a revised armament. Unlike Amiral Cécille, which carried a large secondary battery, the new ship would carry only a few medium guns. The Conseil examined Galiber's proposal in a meeting on 15 July, and they approved it largely without changes, apart from increasing the displacement from 3,700 t (3,600 long tons; 4,100 short tons) to 4,100 t (4,000 long tons; 4,500 short tons). Galiber took the revised specifications and forwarded them to France's shipyards on 21 July to request refined design proposals.

Eight shipyards responded by early 1886, which the Conseil examined in a meeting on 2 March. They accepted four of the proposals for further refinement, and on 31 July, two of these were formally accepted. The first, drawn up by Jules Thibaudier, became Jean Bart; the second became the similar cruiser Alger. Because they were approved at the same time and were generally similar, the two ships are sometimes considered to be the same class, and are referred to as the Alger class, but they are in fact different designs that vary considerably in their particulars.

By this time, Admiral Théophile Aube had replaced Galiber as naval minister. Aube was an ardent supporter of the Jeune École doctrine, which envisioned using a combination of cruisers and torpedo boats to defend France and attack enemy merchant shipping. By the time Aube had come to office, the French Navy had laid down three large protected cruisers that were intended to serve as commerce raiders: Sfax, Tage, and Amiral Cécille. His proposed budget called for another six large cruisers and ten smaller vessels, but by the time it was approved later in 1886, it had been modified to three large cruisers, two medium cruisers, and six small cruisers.

To meet the requirement for the large vessels, Aube ordered a second member of the Jean Bart class, which was named Dupuy de Lôme. In November, the second ship was cancelled in favor of a second member of the Alger class, but on 1 March 1887, the navy ordered another Jean Bart-class cruiser named Isly. The ships were originally intended to carry a three-masted barque sailing rig, but on 4 May 1888, Jules François Émile Krantz, who was by then the naval minister, ordered the rig to be removed in favor of heavy military masts. The light armament was also revised, as the masts were intended to carry some of these guns. The Jean Bart class and Alger proved to be the last of the large commerce-raiding cruisers built for the French fleet ordered by Aube. The French Navy would later return to the idea with Guichen and Châteaurenault in the late 1890s.

=== General characteristics and machinery ===
Plan and profile drawing of Jean Bart

The ships of the Jean Bart class were 107.7 m (353 ft 4 in) long at the waterline and 109.6 m (359 ft 7 in) long overall, with a beam of 13.3 m (43 ft 8 in) and am average draft of 6.05 m (19 ft 10 in), which increased to 6.4 m (21 ft 0 in) aft. They displaced 4,165 t (4,099 long tons; 4,591 short tons) normally, and at full load, Jean Bart and Isly displaced 4,436 and 4,300 t (4,366 and 4,232 long tons; 4,890 and 4,740 short tons), respectively. Their hulls featured a pronounced ram bow and a tumblehome shape, along with a sloped, overhanging stern. The bow was not strengthened to allow the ships to ram an opponent, however. The ships had a minimal superstructure, consisting primarily of a small conning tower and bridge forward. The cruisers carried a pair of heavy military masts fitted with fighting tops for some of their light guns and observation positions. Their crew varied over the course of their careers, amounting to 331–405 officers and enlisted men.

The ship's propulsion system consisted of a pair of horizontal, 3-cylinder triple-expansion steam engines for Jean Bart and Isly, driving two screw propellers in both vessels. Steam was provided by eight coal-burning fire-tube boilers. Each ships' boilers were ducted into two funnels. Their machinery was rated to produce 7,700 indicated horsepower (5,700 kW) for Jean Bart and 8,100 ihp (6,000 kW) for Isly; both ships were to have a top speed of 19 knots (35 km/h; 22 mph), but on speed trials, Jean Bart made just 18.41 knots (34.10 km/h; 21.19 mph) from 7,707 ihp (5,747 kW) while Isly reached just 18.28 knots (33.85 km/h; 21.04 mph) from 8,252 ihp (6,154 kW). Normal coal storage amounted to 750 t (740 long tons; 830 short tons) for Jean Bart and 880 t (870 long tons; 970 short tons) for Isly, but up to 940 t (930 long tons; 1,040 short tons) could be carried. This permitted a cruising radius of 7,014 nautical miles (12,990 km; 8,072 mi) at 10 knots (19 km/h; 12 mph).

=== Armament and armor ===
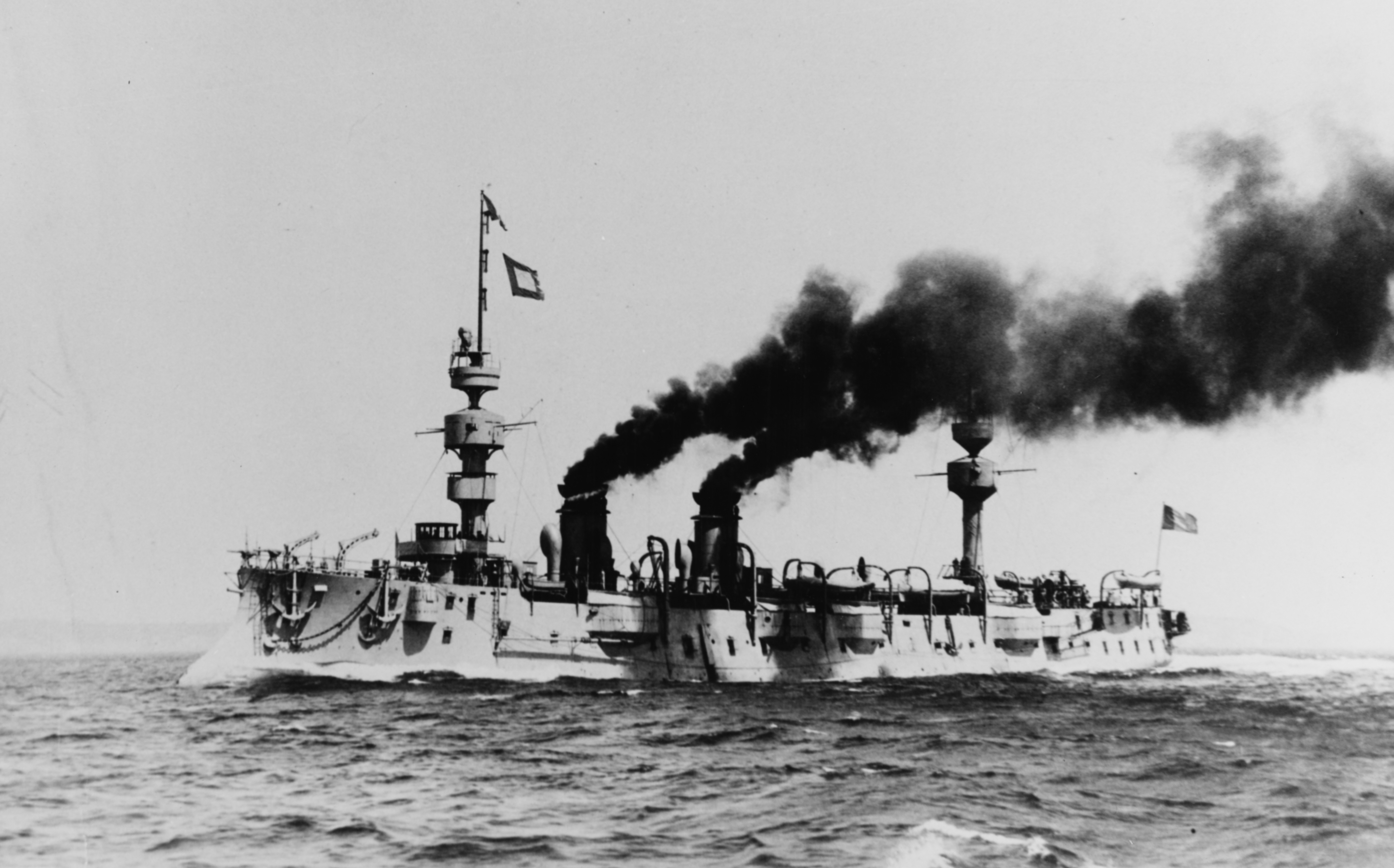
Isly underway, c. 1894

The ships were armed with a main battery of four 164.7 mm (6.48 in) M1881 28-caliber guns and a secondary battery of six 138.6 mm (5.46 in) M1881 30-cal. guns. All of these guns were placed in individual pivot mounts on the upper deck; the 164 mm guns were in sponsons located fore and aft, with two guns per broadside. Four of the 138 mm guns were in sponsons between the 164 mm guns, one was in an embrasure in the forecastle and the last was in a swivel mount on the stern. The 138 mm guns were supplied with a variety of shells, including solid cast iron projectiles and explosive armor-piercing shells, both of which weighed 30 kg (66 lb). The guns fired with a muzzle velocity of 590 m/s (1,900 ft/s).

For close-range defense against torpedo boats, Jean Bart carried a pair of 65 mm (2.6 in) M1888 50-cal. guns, six 47 mm (1.9 in) 3-pounder M1885 Hotchkiss guns, and eight 37 mm (1.5 in) Hotchkiss revolver cannon, though Isly only received the 47 mm and 37 mm guns. Both ships carried a pair of 65 mm 18-cal. field guns that could be sent ashore with a landing party. They were also armed with five 356 mm (14 in) torpedo tubes in their hull above the waterline. Two tubes were in the bow, there was one tube per broadside, and the fifth was in the stern.

The ships received wrought iron armor plating. Armor protection consisted of a curved armor deck that was 40 mm (2 in) thick on the flat portion, increasing in thickness to 90 mm (4 in) on the sides, where it curved down to meet the sides of the hull. The lower edge of the deck tapered slightly to 85 mm (3.3 in). The deck was layered on 10 mm of hull plating, which increased to 15 mm (0.59 in) at the edge of the deck to compensate for the slight reduction in thickness. Below the deck and above the propulsion machinery spaces, a thin deck covered the engine and boiler rooms to protect them from shell fragments. Above the deck and at the sides of the hull, the ships had a 60 cm (24 in) wide cofferdam that was extensively compartmentalized to control flooding in the event of damage above the deck. Jean Bart had 80 mm (3.1 in) plating on the conning tower, while Isly had 120 mm (4.7 in) for her tower. Both ships received gun shields that were 54 mm (2.1 in) thick; these were fitted to the 164 and 138 mm guns. The sponsons that held the guns had 35 mm (1.4 in) chrome steel plating.

=== Modifications ===
Jean Bart after her refit

The ships underwent a series of refits and modernizations over the courses of their careers. On 28 January 1891, before the ships had entered active service, the naval minister Édouard Barbey ordered the M1881 guns in the main and secondary batteries to be replaced with new M1891 quick-firing guns of the same calibers. But these were heavier guns than the M1881 patterns initially mounted, and the sponsons would have had to have been strengthened considerably to accept the weight. As a result, Barbey settled for replacing them with modified M1881 pattern guns that were converted to quick firing. Work on replacing the guns was delayed while Jean Bart was undergoing her sea trials, and it was not carried out until 1893–1894, though Isly was completed with the new guns.

Early in the ships' careers, the heavy military masts were found to cause rolling problems, since their great weight raised the ships' center of gravity. They also suffered from excessive vibration when the ships steamed at high speeds, and the commander of Isly reported in 1894 that he lacked enough crew to effectively man the gun positions. As a result, Jean Bart had hers shortened considerably in 1897, to roughly the same height as the conning tower, and lighter, composite wood-and-steel pole masts erected on top. Isly instead simply had hers removed completely in favor of pole masts that year. At that time, Jean Bart had her bow torpedo tubes removed and Isly lost both of the bow tubes and her stern tube.

During an extensive refit between February 1903 and July 1905, Jean Bart was re-boilered with twelve water-tube Niclausse boilers; during trials after completion of the refit, she managed a speed of 17.03 knots (31.54 km/h; 19.60 mph) from 7,025 ihp (5,239 kW) according to Roberts, but Conway's All the World's Fighting Ships reports that she reached 20 knots (37 km/h; 23 mph) from 10,000 indicated horsepower (7,500 kW). (Note: The difference may be accounted for by the use of forced draft.) At the same time, her light armament was revised to two 65 mm guns, ten 47 mm guns, and four 37 mm guns; her main battery remained the same. Isly was refitted in 1909, though her light battery was standardized to just twelve 47 mm guns. The navy considered replacing her boilers as well, but decided against it because of the cost.

== Construction ==
Construction data
Name	Laid down	Launched	Commissioned	Shipyard
Jean Bart	September 1887	24 October 1889	5 March 1891	Arsenal de Rochefort, Rochefort
Dupuy de Lôme	—	—	—	Arsenal de Brest, Brest
Isly	3 July 1887	22 June 1891	25 October 1892	Arsenal de Brest, Brest

== Service history ==
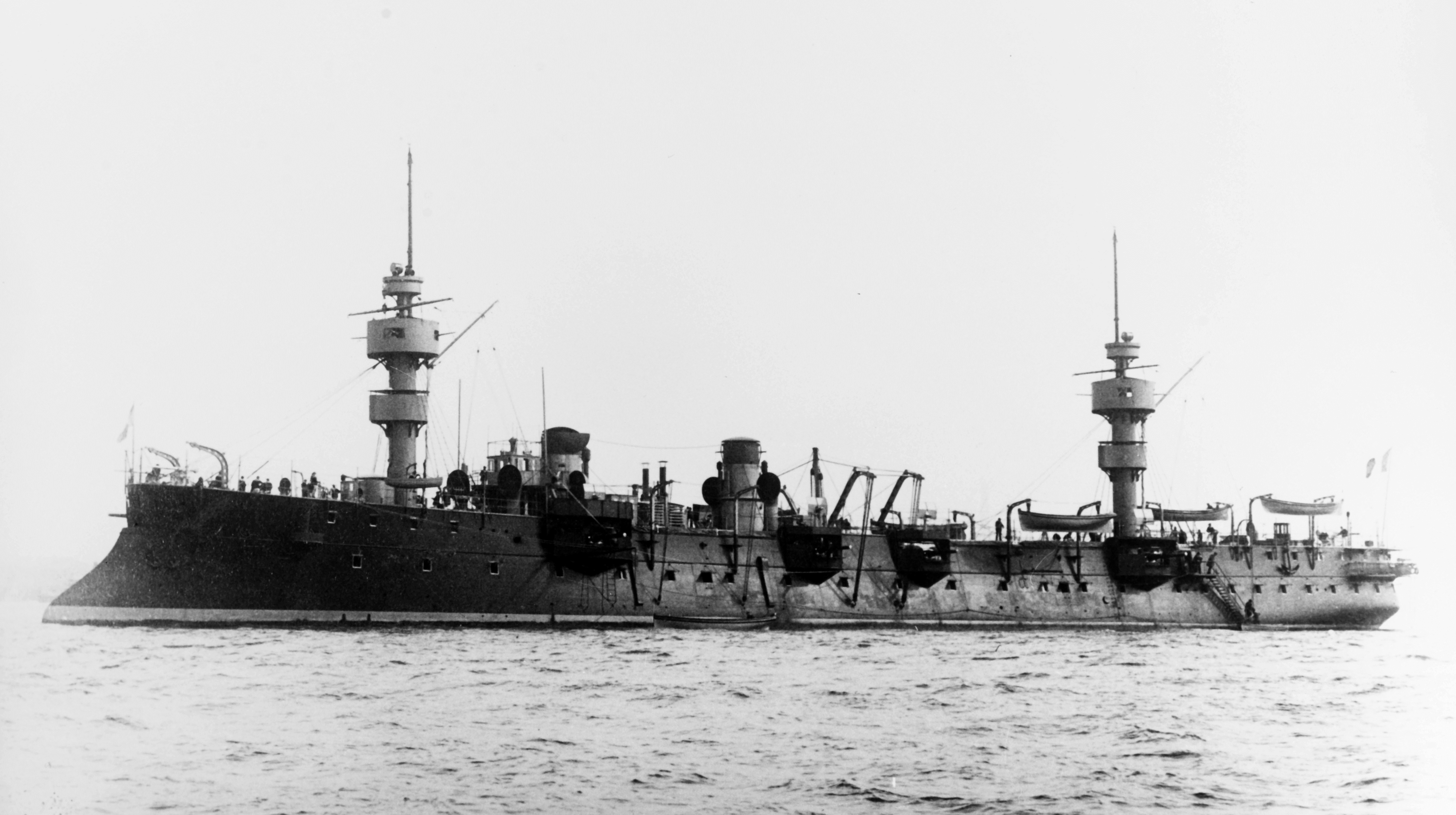
Jean Bart at the Columbian Naval Review in April 1893

Isly initially served in the Northern Squadron as part of the Reserve Division, being activated only for maneuvers with the unit. Jean Bart, meanwhile, initially served with the Mediterranean Squadron before being transferred to the Northern Squadron in 1895. Early in her career, in April 1893, Jean Bart visited the United States to take part in the Columbian Naval Review. In 1895, Isly was deployed to French Indochina; though she briefly returned to France the following year before embarking on another deployment to the Far East in 1897 to relieve the cruiser Alger. At that time, Jean Bart was modernized and had her heavy military masts removed.

Jean Bart joined Isly in Indochina in 1898, though the latter was reassigned to the North Atlantic station in 1899. Jean Bart was part of the French fleet that responded to the Boxer Uprising in Qing China later that year. In May 1901, Jean Bart was recalled home, where she was also placed in reserve. In 1902, Isly had new water-tube boilers installed. Jean Bart was similarly modified between 1903 and 1906.

Jean Bart had run aground off the Western Sahara in February 1907 and could not be refloated. The ship quickly broke in half and the wreck was sold to a marine salvage company. In 1908, Isly was briefly sent to French Morocco, and the following year she was converted into a depot ship for destroyers. Isly was struck from the naval register in 1914 and thereafter broken up.
