= French cruiser Alger =

Protected cruiser of the French Navy

- Alger

Class overview
- Preceded by: Jean Bart class
- Succeeded by: Friant class

History

France
- Name: Alger
- Ordered: 14 February 1887
- Builder: Arsenal de Cherbourg
- Laid down: November 1887
- Launched: 24 November 1889
- Commissioned: 1892
- Decommissioned: 12 October 1910
- In service: June 1892
- Stricken: 23 November 1910
- Fate: Broken up, 1940

General characteristics
- Type: Protected cruiser
- Displacement: Normal: 4,123 t (4,058 long tons; 4,545 short tons); Full load: 4,356 t (4,287 long tons; 4,802 short tons)
- Length: 109 m (357 ft 7 in) loa
- Beam: 13.8 m (45 ft 3 in) (waterline)
- Draft: 5.75 m (18 ft 10 in)
- Installed power: 24 × water-tube boilers; 8,200 indicated horsepower (6,100 kW)
- Propulsion: 2 × triple-expansion engines; 2 × screw propellers
- Speed: 19 knots (35 km/h; 22 mph)
- Range: 6,440 nmi (11,930 km; 7,410 mi) at 10 knots (19 km/h; 12 mph)
- Complement: 387–405
- Armament: 4 × 164.7 mm (6.48 in) guns; 6 × 138.6 mm (5.46 in) guns; 2 × 65 mm (2.6 in) 9-pounder guns; 8 × 47 mm (1.9 in) guns; 8 × 37 mm (1.5 in) Hotchkiss revolver cannon; 5 × 356 mm (14 in) torpedo tubes
- Armor: Deck: 40 to 90 mm (2 to 4 in); Conning tower: 70 mm (3 in); Gun shields: 54 mm (2.1 in)

Alger was the sole member of her class of protected cruiser built for the French Navy in the late 1880s and early 1890s. Alger was ordered during the tenure of Admiral Théophile Aube as Minister of Marine according to the theories of the Jeune École doctrine. The ship was intended as a long-range commerce raider, and she was armed with a main battery of four 164 mm (6.5 in) guns, was protected by an armor deck that was 50 to 100 mm (2 to 4 in) thick, and was capable of steaming at a top speed of 19.5 knots (36.1 km/h; 22.4 mph).

Alger served with the Northern Squadron early in her career, where she took part in routine peacetime training exercises. In 1895, she was deployed to French Indochina, returning to France in 1897 for a stint with the Mediterranean Squadron. Placed in reserve by 1901, she remained out of service for several years. Reports conflict over her activities in the mid-1900s, with contemporary reports placing her in the Mediterranean for fleet maneuvers, while later historians state the ship was on a second tour in East Asia from 1905. Both agree that Alger served in Asian waters as late as 1908. The ship was reduced to a storage hulk in 1911 and remained in the fleet's inventory until 1939, when she was broken up.

== Design ==
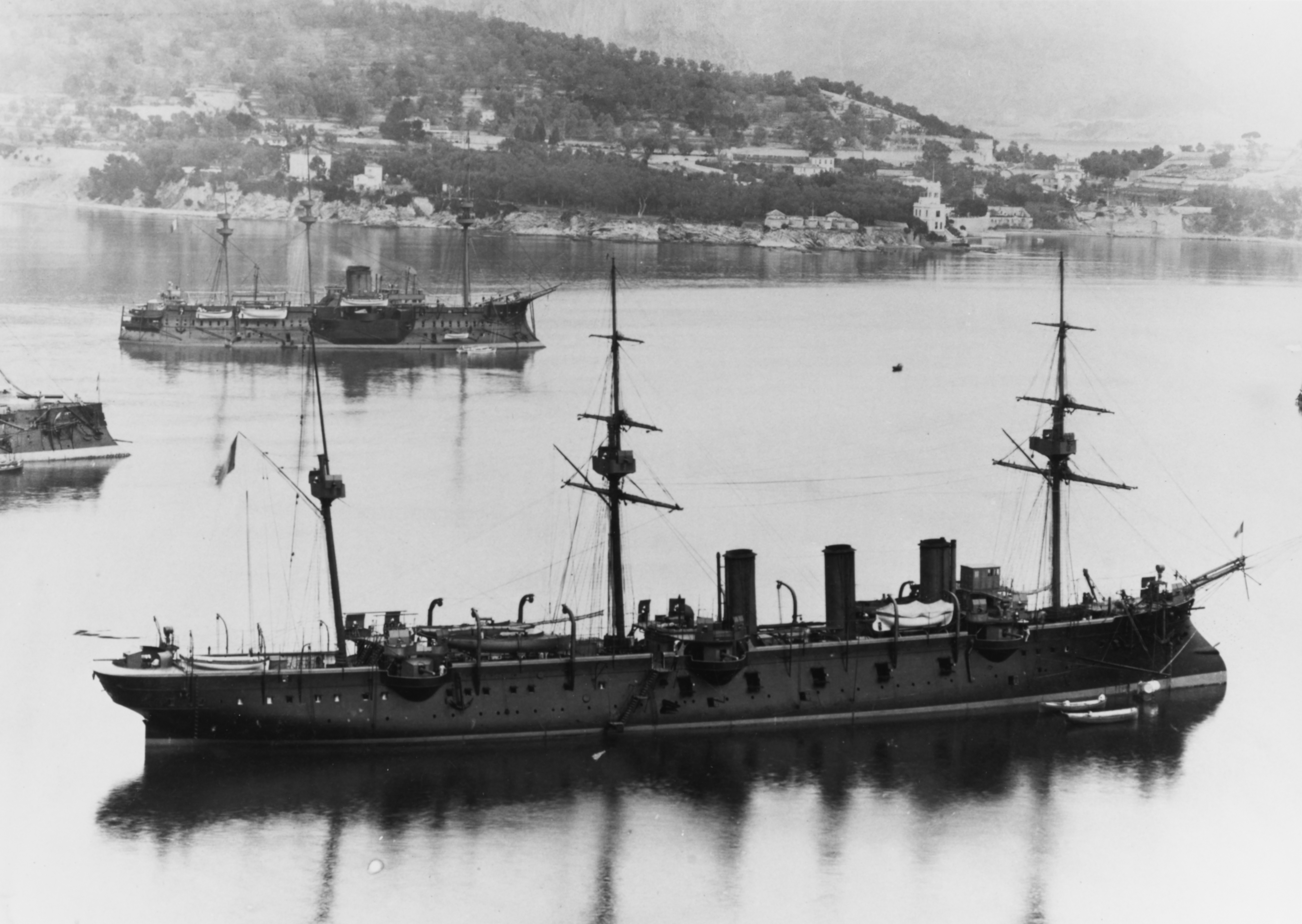
Amiral Cécille, the predecessor to the Alger design

The French naval minister, Charles-Eugène Galiber, drew up specifications for a new commerce raiding cruiser in mid-1885, which he submitted to the Conseil des Travaux (Council of Works) for consideration on 12 June. The new ship was to generally follow the patter of the earlier cruiser Amiral Cécille, but slightly smaller and a revised armament. Unlike Amiral Cécille, which carried a large secondary battery, the new ship would carry only a few medium guns. The Conseil examined Galiber's proposal in a meeting on 15 July, and they approved it largely without changes, apart from increasing the displacement from 3,700 t (3,600 long tons; 4,100 short tons) to 4,100 t (4,000 long tons; 4,500 short tons). Galiber took the revised specifications and forwarded them to France's shipyards on 21 July to request refined design proposals.

Eight shipyards responded by early 1886, which the Conseil examined in a meeting on 2 March. They accepted four of the proposals for further refinement, and on 31 July, two of these were formally accepted. The first, drawn up by Jules Thibaudier, became the Jean Bart; the second, from Théodore Marchal, became Alger. Because they were approved at the same time and were generally similar, the two ships are sometimes considered to be the same class, and are referred to as the Alger class, but they are in fact different designs that vary considerably in their particulars. Unlike Jean Bart, Alger adopted Belleville-type water-tube boilers that had been successfully used aboard the unprotected cruiser Milan, and her armament was arranged differently. Marchal adopted a hull form similar to the British cruiser HMS Iris, which had famously exceeded 18 knots (33 km/h; 21 mph) during her sea trials.

The original Alger was ordered on 13 October 1886, but on 29 October, this ship was renamed Dupuy de Lôme after a Jean Bart-class cruiser of that name was cancelled. A second ship was ordered to Marchal's design on 14 February 1887, which in turn received the name Alger. Dupuy de Lôme was cancelled on 16 August in favor of a third vessel, an armored cruiser, also named Dupuy de Lôme, leaving the second Alger the only member of the class to be built. After both designs entered service, the navy evaluated Alger and the Jean Bart class, finding the latter to have a superior hull form. Alger also proved to be more vulnerable to damage in heavy seas, as the sponsons for the main and secondary guns extended further from the sides of the hull. She also tended to take on water more than the Jean Barts.

=== General characteristics and machinery ===
Plan and profile drawing of Alger

Alger was 105.6 m (346 ft 5 in) long at the waterline and 109 m (357 ft 7 in) long overall, with a beam of 13.8 m (45 ft 3 in) at the waterline and 16.12 m (52 ft 11 in) over the sponsons. She had an average draft of 5.75 m (18 ft 10 in), which increased to 6.47 m (21 ft 3 in) aft. She displaced 4,123 t (4,058 long tons; 4,545 short tons) normally and up to 4,356 t (4,287 long tons; 4,802 short tons) at full load. Her hull featured a pronounced ram bow and a tumblehome shape, along with a sloped, overhanging stern. The bow was not strengthened to allow the ship to ram an opponent, however. Alger had a minimal superstructure, consisting primarily of a small conning tower and bridge forward. The cruiser carried a pair of heavy military masts fitted with fighting tops for some of her light guns and observation positions. Her crew varied over the course of her career, amounting to 387–405 officers and enlisted men.

The ship's propulsion system consisted of a pair of 3-cylinder triple-expansion steam engines driving two screw propellers. Steam was provided by twenty-four coal-burning Belleville-type water-tube boilers that were ducted into two funnels. Her machinery was rated to produce 8,200 indicated horsepower (6,100 kW) for a top speed of 19 knots (35 km/h; 22 mph), but on her initial speed trials, her engines reached 19.61 knots (36.32 km/h; 22.57 mph) from 7,928 ihp (5,912 kW). She had a cruising radius of 6,440 nautical miles (11,930 km; 7,410 mi) at 10 knots (19 km/h; 12 mph).

=== Armament and armor ===
An early version of the Alger design depicting the sailing rig originally planned

The ship was armed with a main battery of four 164.7 mm (6.48 in) M1881 28-caliber guns and a secondary battery of six 138.6 mm (5.46 in) M1881 30-cal. guns. All of these guns were placed in individual pivot mounts; the 164.7 mm guns were in sponsons located fore and aft, with two guns per broadside. Four of the 138.6 mm guns were in sponsons between the 164 mm guns, one was in an embrasure in the forecastle and the last was in a swivel mount on the stern. For close-range defense against torpedo boats, she carried twelve 47 mm (1.9 in) M1885 3-pounder Hotchkiss guns, and eight 37 mm (1.5 in) M1885 Hotchkiss revolver cannon. Alger also carried a pair of 65 mm (2.6 in) M1881 16-cal. field guns that could be sent ashore with a landing party. She was also armed with five 356 mm (14 in) torpedo tubes in her hull above the waterline. Two were in the bow, one per broadside, and the fifth was in the stern.

Armor protection consisted of wrought iron, the primary component of which was the main armor deck. It was that was 40 mm (1.6 in) thick, layered on 10 mm (0.39 in) of normal hull plating, on the flat portion that covered most of the ship. Toward the sides of the hull, it sloped downward to provide a measure of vertical protection, and in increased significantly in thickness to 90 mm (3.5 in), tapering slightly to 85 mm (3.3 in) where it connected to the sides of the ship. The sloped portion of the deck was also mounted on 10 mm of hull plating, apart from the bottom edge, where it increased to 15 mm (0.59 in) to compensate for the reduced thickness of the deck. Below the deck and above the propulsion machinery spaces, a thin 8 mm (0.31 in) splinter deck protected the engine and boiler rooms from shell fragments that penetrated the main deck. The conning tower had 70 mm (2.8 in) of iron plating on the sides, and the ship's main and secondary guns were fitted with 54 mm (2.1 in) thick gun shields.

=== Modifications ===
Alger underwent a series of refits throughout her career. In 1893, shortly after entering service, her main and secondary batteries were upgraded to quick-firing guns of the same calibers. These were converted M1881 pattern guns. The ship's military masts were replaced with lighter pole masts in 1897, and her bow and stern torpedo tubes were removed. Her armament was revised again in 1900; the main and secondary batteries remained unchanged, but her light armament now consisted of a pair of 65 mm M1888 50-cal. guns and ten 47 mm guns. She retained the 65 mm field guns, but added three 37 mm guns that could be fitted to the ship's boats. Between 1903 and 1906, the remaining pair of torpedo tubes were removed, and during this period in 1904, her boilers were refurbished.

== Service history ==
Sketch of Alger, c. 1893

The French Navy ordered Alger on 14 February 1887, and the keel for the new ship was laid down at the Arsenal de Cherbourg shipyard in Cherbourg in November. Her completed hull was launched on 24 November 1889. She was commissioned to begin sea trials in early 1892, including full-power tests in May. Her initial testing was completed in June, at which time she was placed in reserve for alterations including the modernization of her main and secondary guns. The ship remained out of service until 1893, when she was commissioned on 17 April for active service. According to Roberts, the ship was assigned to the Mediterranean Squadron, but the contemporary journal The Naval Annual reported that she was assigned to the Northern Squadron, which that time included the ironclads Requin and Victorieuse, the coastal defense ship Furieux, and the protected cruiser Surcouf. Alger took part in the fleet maneuvers in 1894; from 9 to 16 July, the ships involved took on supplies in Toulon for the maneuvers that began later on the 16th. A series of exercises included shooting practice, a blockade simulation, and scouting operations in the western Mediterranean. The maneuvers concluded on 3 August.

Alger was sent with the protected cruiser Isly on a cruise to French Indochina, departing in October 1895. In the immediate aftermath of the Chinese defeat in the First Sino-Japanese War in May 1895, the French sent Alger, Isly, and the unprotected cruiser Beautemps-Beaupré up the Yangtze River to Nanking to demand that previous agreements regarding protection of French missionaries in the country be enforced. The ships arrived in the city on 29 June, but later that day, Beautemps-Beaupré received orders via telegram to depart immediately for Callao, Peru. Alger and Isly remained in the city for several days as negotiations took place. The Chinese eventually agreed to meet French demands, and the two cruisers exchanged salutes with the Chinese cruiser Nan Chen. Alger remained on station in the Far East in 1896, and returned to France in February 1897.

After arriving home, she was assigned to the Mediterranean Squadron for the annual maneuvers that were conducted in July. That year, while in Toulon, the ship had her masts replaced. Alger had been deactivated and placed in the reserve fleet by January 1901. During this period, the ship underwent additional refits. The ship's activities in the mid-1900s are unclear; Thomas Brassey's The Naval Annual lists Alger among the vessels that took part in the fleet maneuvers in 1906, which began on 6 July with the concentration of the Northern and Mediterranean Squadrons in Algiers. The maneuvers were conducted in the western Mediterranean, alternating between ports in French North Africa and Toulon and Marseille, France, and concluding on 4 August. But according to the historians John Jordan and Philippe Caresse, Alger had been reactivated in 1905 for another deployment to the Far East, along with the armored cruisers Bruix and Dupetit-Thouars, the protected cruiser Guichen, four gunboats, and five destroyers.

The Naval Annual confirms that Alger was in service in the Far East by 1907, by which time the unit consisted of the large protected cruiser D'Entrecasteaux, Bruix, the armored cruiser Chanzy, and the smaller protected cruisers Descartes and Catinat, though the latter two vessels were detached from the main squadron to patrol the East Indies and Pacific, respectively. Alger remained in the Far East in 1908, along with D'Entrecasteaux and Bruix. After returning to France, Alger was decommissioned on 12 October 1910 and was struck from the naval register on 23 November 1911. She was placed for sale in Rochefort that year but was not initially sold, and was therefore used as a hulk in Rochefort through 1914. She was later moved to Lorient, where she was used as a hulk for various purposes from 1920 to 1939. The ship was eventually sold to ship breakers in 1940.
