= Descartes-class cruiser =

Protected cruiser class of the French Navy

- Pascal, c. 1897–1900

Class overview
- Name: Descartes class
- Builders: Arsenal de Toulon; Arsenal De Loire
- Operators: French Navy
- Preceded by: Linois class
- Succeeded by: D'Assas class
- Built: 1892–1897
- In commission: 1896–1920
- Completed: 2
- Retired: 2

General characteristics
- Type: Protected cruiser
- Displacement: 4,005 t (3,942 long tons; 4,415 short tons)
- Length: 100.7 m (330 ft 5 in) loa
- Beam: 12.95 m (42 ft 6 in)
- Draft: 6.01 m (19 ft 9 in)
- Installed power: 16 × water-tube boilers; 8,300 ihp (6,200 kW)
- Propulsion: 2 × triple-expansion steam engines; 2 × screw propellers
- Speed: 19 knots (35 km/h; 22 mph)
- Complement: 383–401
- Armament: 4 × 164.7 mm (6.48 in) guns; 10 × 100 mm (3.9 in) guns; 8 × 47 mm (1.9 in) guns; 4 × 37 mm (1.5 in) guns; 2 × 356 mm (14 in) torpedo tubes
- Armor: Deck: 20 to 40 mm (0.79 to 1.57 in); Conning tower: 80 mm (3 in); Gun shields: 54 mm (2.1 in)

The Descartes class comprised two protected cruisers of the French Navy built in the early 1890s; the two ships were Descartes and Pascal. They were ordered as part of a naval construction program directed at France's rivals, Italy and Germany, particularly after Italy made progress in modernizing its own fleet. The plan was also intended to remedy a deficiency in cruisers that had been revealed during training exercises in the 1880s. As such, the Descartes-class cruisers were intended to operate as fleet scouts and in the French colonial empire. The ships were armed with a main battery of four 164.7 mm (6.48 in) guns supported by ten 100 mm (3.9 in) guns and they had a top speed of 19 knots (35 km/h; 22 mph).

Descartes and Pascal were initially sent to French Indochina in the late 1890s, where they participated in the campaign to suppress the Boxer Uprising in Qing China. Descartes was recalled to France in 1902 to serve in the Atlantic Division while Pascal remained in East Asia, serving until 1904 when she was deactivated due to poor condition. Descartes was sent back to East Asia in 1905 and later to French Madagascar before returning to France in 1907, thereafter serving with the main French fleets in the Mediterranean Sea and English Channel. Pascal was sold to ship breakers in 1911, while Descartes served another stint in the Atlantic Division. She remained there during the first three years of World War I before returning to France in 1917, where she was disarmed and decommissioned. She was struck from the naval register in 1920 and was sold for scrap the following year.

== Background ==
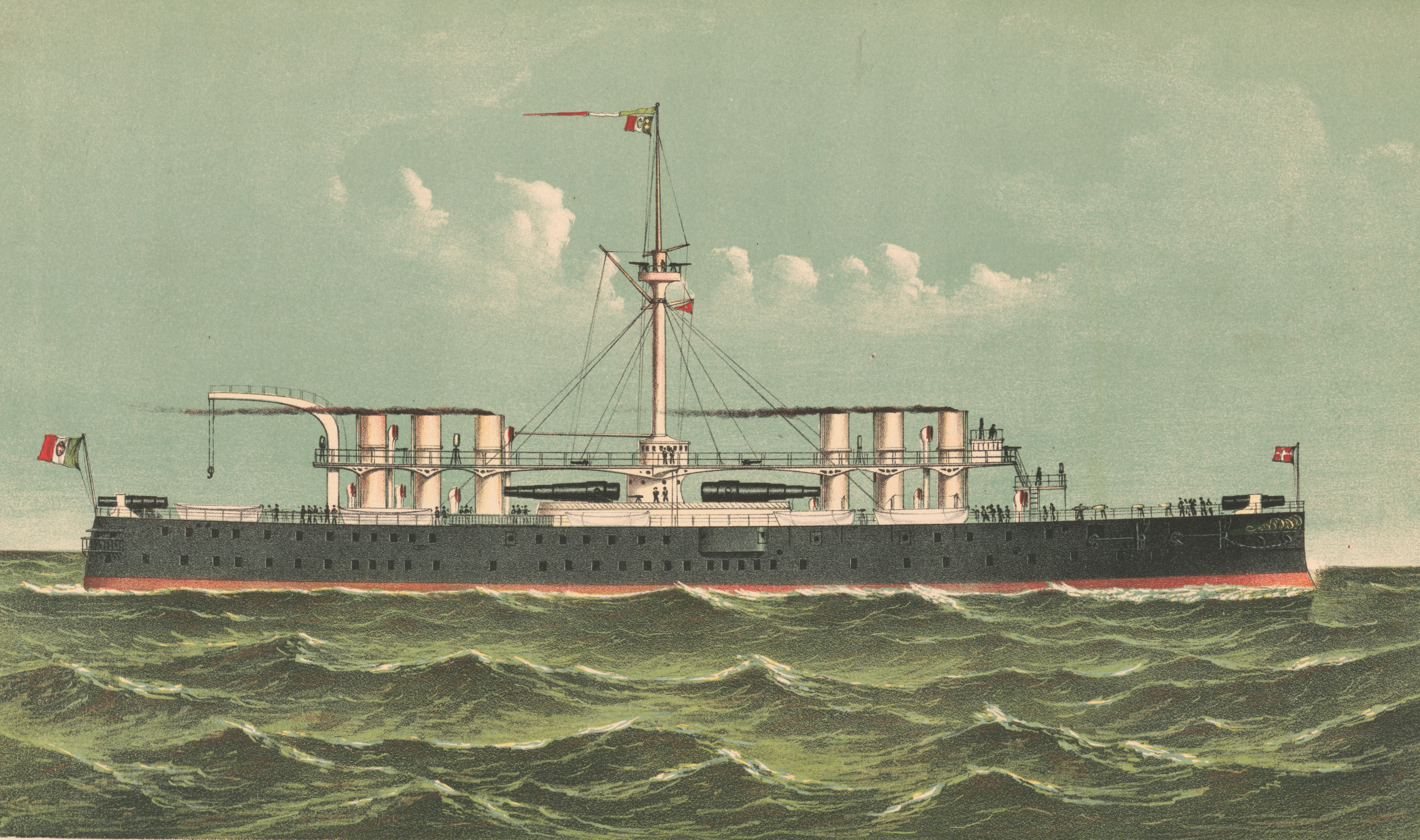
The fast Italian ironclad Italia, the threat of which prompted the French naval program of 1890

In the late 1880s, the Italian Regia Marina (Royal Navy) accelerated construction of ships for its fleet and reorganized the most modern ironclad battleships—the Duilio and Italia classes—into a fast squadron suitable for offensive operations. These developments provoked a strong response in the French press. The Budget Committee in the French Chamber of Deputies began to press for a "two-power standard" in 1888, which would see the French fleet enlarged to equal the combined Italian and German fleets, then France's two main rivals on the continent. This initially came to nothing, as the supporters of the Jeune École doctrine called for a fleet largely based on squadrons of torpedo boats to defend the French coasts rather than an expensive fleet of ironclads. This view had significant support in the Chamber of Deputies.

The next year, a war scare with Italy led to further outcry to strengthen the fleet. To compound matters, the visit of a German squadron of four ironclads to Italy confirmed French concerns of a combined Italo-German fleet that would dramatically outnumber their own. Training exercises held in France that year demonstrated that the slower French fleet would be unable to prevent the faster Italian squadron from bombarding the French coast at will, in part because it lacked enough cruisers (and doctrine to use them) to scout for the enemy ships.

To correct the weaknesses of the French fleet, on 22 November 1890, the Superior Council authorized a new construction program directed not at simple parity with the Italian and German fleets, but numerical superiority. In addition to twenty-four new battleships, a total of seventy cruisers were to be built for use in home waters and overseas in the French colonial empire. The Descartes class were ordered to as part of the program.

== Design ==
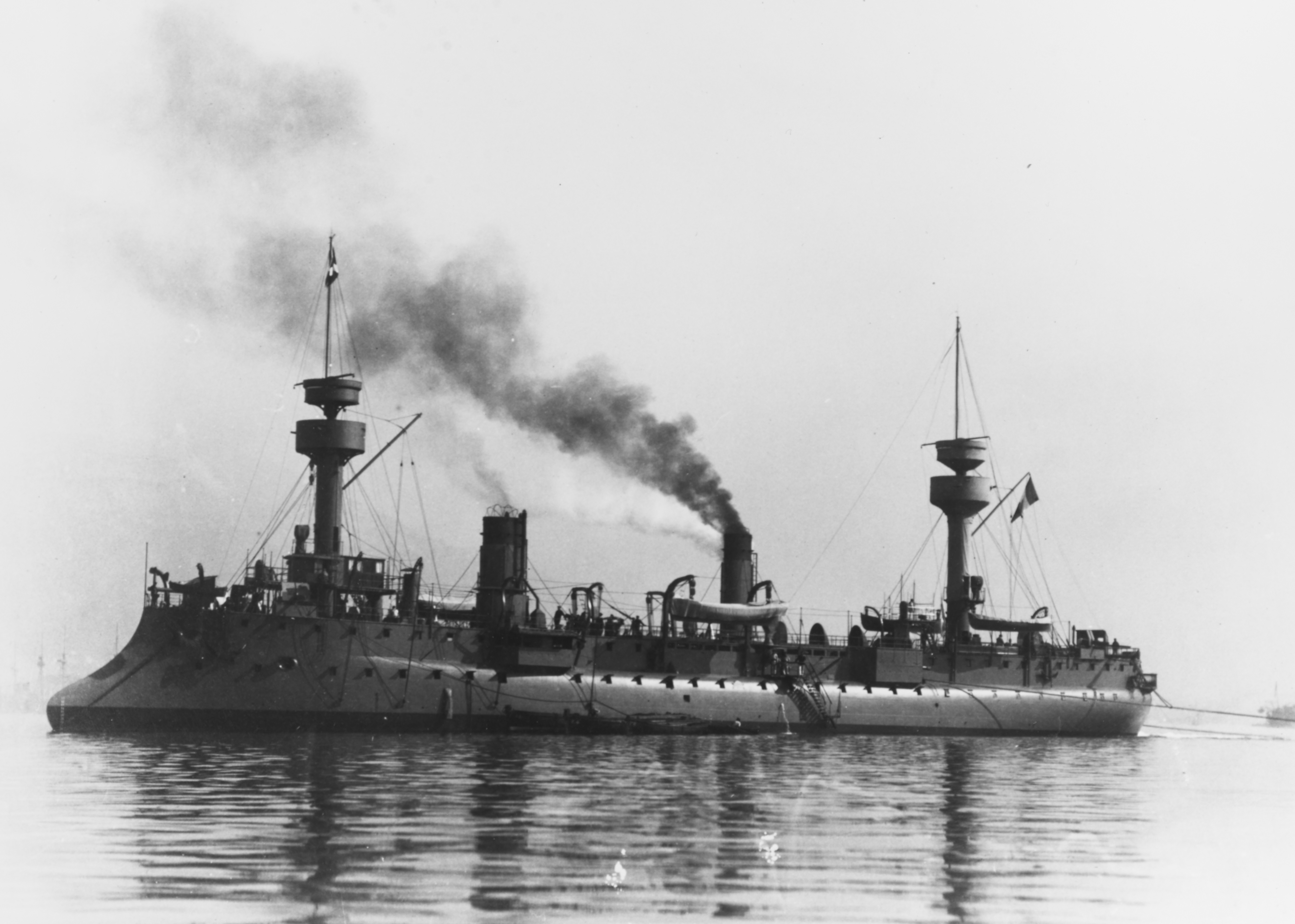
Davout, which provided the basis for the Descartes design

To meet the requirements for new cruisers for overseas deployments, the French naval minister, Édouard Barbey, issued a request on 4 November 1890 for design proposals similar to the older Lapérouse and Villars classes. Barbey laid out his requirements for the Conseil des Travaux (Council of Works), which included a maximum displacement of 2,500 t (2,461 long tons; 2,756 short tons), a speed of at least 16 knots (30 km/h; 18 mph) at natural draft, and a cruising radius of 4,500 nautical miles (8,300 km; 5,200 mi) at 10 knots (19 km/h; 12 mph) with a normal load of coal (and up to 6,000 nmi (11,000 km; 6,900 mi) with a maximum load). Armament was set at four 164.7 mm (6.48 in) guns and ten 100 mm (3.9 in) guns, and the ship was to be protected by deck consisting of a pair of 10 mm (0.39 in) layers. The new ships were to incorporate a barque sailing rig for extended voyages overseas. The Conseil made several alterations, including increasing the speed and cruising radius, which necessitated a displacement of around 2,900 t (2,900 long tons; 3,200 short tons). Barbey approved their recommendations and requested proposals from several shipyards on 3 February 1891.

Five shipyards submitted proposals to meet Barbey's requirements by mid-1891, and the Conseil reviewed the submissions during a meeting on 31 July. They chose two—one from Marie de Bussy, then working for Ateliers et Chantiers de la Loire, and the other from the government naval constructor Joseph Louis Tissier—for further refinement. De Bussy's design was in general arrangement and enlarged version of the cruiser Davout, with the same hull lines, with roughly the same length to beam ratio. The Conseil selected de Bussy's design, but made a number of alterations to it, including increasing the scale of armor protection, as well as replacing the planned Lagrafel d'Allest water-tube boilers with Belleville models, as they would provide a superior internal arrangement. Tissier's proposal eventually became the Catinat-class cruisers.

During construction, a number of changes to the design were introduced. They were initially to have carried a pair of 450 mm (17.7 in) torpedo tubes, but on 14 June 1893, Henri Rieunier, who was then the naval minister, ordered they be replaced with 356 mm (14 in) versions. A year later, on 9 June, the naval minister Félix Faure ordered the military masts be replaced with lighter pole masts to save weight. Several alterations were done to Descartes only, including lengthening the forecastle deck to add crew berthing and shortening her funnels, which caused her to roll excessively. Both ships were insufficiently ventilated, which did not lend them to the lengthy deployments to tropical French Indochina during their careers; they were also cramped ships. They were nevertheless well regarded by foreign contemporaries, particularly for the efficient arrangement of their armament and their seakeeping abilities.

=== General characteristics and machinery ===
The two Descartes-class cruisers were 96.3 m (316 ft) long between perpendiculars, 99.4 m (326 ft) long at the waterline, and 100.7 m (330 ft) long overall. They had a beam of 12.95 m (42 ft 6 in) and an average draft of 6.01 m (19 ft 9 in), which increased to 6.86 m (22.5 ft) aft. They displaced 4,005.66 t (3,942.40 long tons; 4,415.48 short tons) as designed. Like most French warships of the period, the Descartes-class cruisers' hulls had a tumblehome shape, a short forecastle deck, and a pronounced ram bow that was not reinforced to be used for ramming attacks. Below the waterline, the hulls were covered in a layer of wood and copper sheathing to protect them from biofouling on long voyages overseas. The sheathing extended up the sides of the hulls 1 m (3 ft 3 in) above the waterline. The ships had a minimal superstructure, consisting primarily of a small conning tower and a bridge. They were fitted with pole masts with spotting tops for observation and signaling purposes. The ships suffered from stability problems and had to have ballast added after completion. Their crew varied over the course of her career, and consisted of 383–401 officers and enlisted men.

The ships' propulsion system consisted of a pair of 4-cylinder vertical triple-expansion steam engines driving two screw propellers. Steam was provided by sixteen coal-burning Belleville-type water-tube boilers that were ducted into two funnels. Their machinery was rated to produce 8,300 indicated horsepower (6,200 kW) for a top speed of 19 knots (35 km/h; 22 mph), but in service, both ships exceeded these figures. Descartes reached 19.59 knots (36.28 km/h; 22.54 mph) from 8,828 ihp (6,583 kW), while Pascal made 19.7 knots (36.5 km/h; 22.7 mph) from 8,943 ihp (6,669 kW). Coal storage amounted to 724 t (713 long tons; 798 short tons), which gave the ships a cruising radius of 5,500 nautical miles (10,200 km; 6,300 mi) at 10 knots (19 km/h; 12 mph) and 1,000 nmi (1,900 km; 1,200 mi) at 19.5 knots.

=== Armament and armor ===
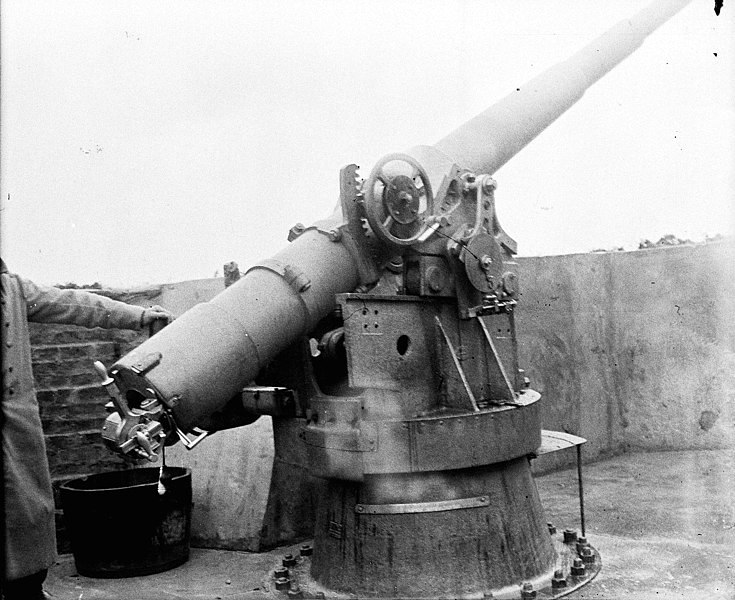
A 100 mm (3.9 in) Model 1891 gun in a pivot mount

Pascal was armed with a main battery of four 164.7 mm (6.5 in) Modèle 1893 45-caliber guns, while Descartes received a mix of three M1887 and one M1891 pattern guns of the same caliber. They were placed in individual sponsons clustered amidships, two guns per broadside. The arrangement kept the significant weight of the guns from the ends of the ship but still allowed two guns to fire ahead or astern. They were supplied with a variety of shells, including solid, 45 kg (99 lb) cast iron projectiles, and explosive armor-piercing (AP) and semi-armor-piercing (SAP) shells that weighed 54.2 kg (119 lb) and 52.6 kg (116 lb), respectively. The guns fired with a muzzle velocity of 770 to 800 m/s (2,500 to 2,600 ft/s).

The main battery was supported by a secondary battery of ten 100 mm (3.9 in) Modèle 1891 45-cal. guns, which were carried in a variety of mounts. Two guns fitted with gun shields were placed side-by-side on the upper deck, four more were in the upper deck forward in casemates. Another pair of guns were in sponsons further aft, and the remaining pair were in pivot mounts on the upper deck aft. The sides of the ships were recessed to allow the primary and secondary guns to fire directly ahead or astern, so that six 100 mm guns could be brought to bear ahead and four aft over limited arcs. The guns fired 14 kg (31 lb) cast iron and 16 kg (35 lb) AP shells with a muzzle velocity of 710 to 740 m/s (2,300 to 2,400 ft/s).

For close-range defense against torpedo boats, they carried eight 47 mm (1.9 in) M1885 3-pounder Hotchkiss guns and four 37 mm (1.5 in) M1885 1-pounder guns. These were all in single pivot mounts, distributed along the length of the ships. They were also armed with two 356 mm (14 in) torpedo tubes in her hull above the waterline.

Armor protection consisted of an extra-mild steel curved armor deck that sloped down at the sides to provide a measure of protection against incoming fire. The flat portion was 25 mm (0.98 in) thick on the flat portion, layered on top of 10 mm (0.39 in) of deck plating. On the sloped sides, the deck increased to 40 mm (1.6 in) on the upper portion and tapering to 20 mm (0.79 in) on the lower edge, also on 10 mm of plating. Descartes was fitted with a 10 mm splinter deck below the main deck and above the propulsion machinery spaces to protect them from shell fragments that penetrated the main deck, but Pascal was not similarly protected. Above the deck, a cellular layer of watertight compartments was intended to contain flooding below the waterline. The compartments would also be used to store coal, which provided additional protection to the ships' machinery spaces. The gun shields for the deck-mounted 100 mm guns were 54 mm (2 in) thick. The ships had 80 mm (3.1 in) plating on the sides of the conning tower, though Descartes received an additional 10 mm layer of steel plating for her tower.

== Construction ==
Construction data
Name	Laid down	Launched	Commissioned	Shipyard
Descartes	January 1893	27 September 1894	12 February 1896	Chantiers de la Loire, Saint-Nazaire
Pascal	4 December 1893	26 September 1895	20 May 1896	Arsenal de Toulon, Toulon

== Service history ==
Plan and profile drawing of the Descartes class

Descartes and Pascal were deployed to French Indochina after entering service in 1897, though Pascal did not leave France until after completing her sea trials by January 1898. Both ships were present during the Boxer Uprising in Qing China; they were among the vessels France contributed to the Eight-Nation Alliance that defeated the Boxers in the early 1900s. Descartes returned to France in 1902, when she joined the Atlantic Division, though Pascal remained in East Asia. Pascal's condition deteriorated after several years abroad, where the French lacked sufficient shipyard facilities, and by 1904, her engines could no longer reach her design speed. She saw little further use thereafter, in part because the French Navy had settled on building a fleet of armored cruisers to fulfill the roles that the Descartes class had been intended to fill. She was struck from the naval register in 1911 and later broken up.

In the meantime, Descartes was sent on a second deployment to East Asia in 1905. She had been transferred to French Madagascar by 1907, and later that year, she returned France to join the Mediterranean Squadron. Descartes was then transferred to the Northern Squadron. By 1914, the ship was operating with the Atlantic Division; she was patrolling in Central American waters and was slated to return to France when World War I started in July. She instead remained in the region and joined the French and British vessels searching for the German light cruiser SMS Karlsruhe that was attacking merchant shipping in the area, though they failed to locate her. Descartes spent the next three years patrolling the West Indies, seeing no action. After returning home in 1917, she was decommissioned and disarmed, her guns being used as field artillery and to arm patrol vessels. She was struck from the naval register in 1920, and she was sold to ship breakers the following year.
