= French cruiser Pascal =

Protected cruiser of the French Navy

- Pascal, c. 1897–1900

History

France
- Name: Pascal
- Laid down: 4 December 1893
- Launched: 26 September 1895
- Commissioned: 20 May 1896
- Decommissioned: 10 June 1909
- In service: 1 June 1897
- Stricken: 24 March 1910
- Fate: Broken up, 1912

General characteristics
- Class & type: Descartes-class cruiser
- Displacement: 4,005 t (3,942 long tons; 4,415 short tons)
- Length: 100.7 m (330 ft 5 in) loa
- Beam: 12.95 m (42 ft 6 in)
- Draft: 6.01 m (19 ft 9 in)
- Installed power: 16 × water-tube boilers; 8,300 ihp (6,200 kW)
- Propulsion: 2 × triple-expansion steam engines; 2 × screw propellers
- Speed: 19 knots (35 km/h; 22 mph)
- Complement: 383–401
- Armament: 4 × 164.7 mm (6.48 in) guns; 10 × 100 mm (3.9 in) guns; 8 × 47 mm (1.9 in) guns; 4 × 37 mm (1.5 in) guns; 2 × 356 mm (14 in) torpedo tubes
- Armor: Deck: 20 to 40 mm (0.79 to 1.57 in); Conning tower: 80 mm (3 in); Gun shields: 54 mm (2.1 in)

Pascal was a protected cruiser of the French Navy built in the 1890s, the second and final member of the Descartes class. The Descartes-class cruisers were ordered as part of a construction program directed at strengthening the fleet's cruiser force. At the time, France was concerned with the growing naval threat of the Italian and German fleets, and the new cruisers were intended to serve with the main fleet, and overseas in the French colonial empire. Pascal was armed with a main battery of four 164.7 mm (6.5 in) guns, was protected by an armor deck that was 20 to 40 mm (0.79 to 1.57 in) thick, and was capable of steaming at a top speed of 19 knots (35 km/h; 22 mph).

Pascal had a fairly short and uneventful career; after entering service in 1897, she was sent to French Indochina, where she served for the next seven years. During this period, she was part of the French squadron that responded to the Boxer Uprising in Qing China. In poor condition by 1904, she saw little further use and was struck from the naval register in 1911, thereafter being broken up.

== Design ==
Plan and profile drawing of the Descartes class

In response to a war scare with Italy in the late 1880s, the French Navy embarked on a major construction program in 1890 to counter the threat of the Italian fleet and that of Italy's ally Germany. The plan called for a total of seventy cruisers for use in home waters and overseas in the French colonial empire. The Descartes class, which comprised Descartes and Pascal, was ordered to as part of the program. The design for the Descartes class was based on the earlier cruiser Davout, but was enlarged to incorporate a more powerful gun armament.

Pascal was 100.7 m (330 ft 5 in) long overall, with a beam of 12.95 m (42 ft 6 in) and an average draft of 6.01 m (19 ft 9 in). She displaced 4,005 t (3,942 long tons; 4,415 short tons) as designed. Her crew varied over the course of her career, and consisted of 383–401 officers and enlisted men. The ship's propulsion system consisted of a pair of triple-expansion steam engines driving two screw propellers. Steam was provided by sixteen coal-burning Belleville-type water-tube boilers that were ducted into two funnels. Her machinery was rated to produce 8,300 indicated horsepower (6,200 kW) for a top speed of 19 knots (35 km/h; 22 mph), but she exceeded these figures on trials, reaching 19.7 knots (36.5 km/h; 22.7 mph) from 8,943 ihp (6,669 kW). She had a cruising radius of 5,500 nautical miles (10,200 km; 6,300 mi) at 10 knots (19 km/h; 12 mph) and 1,000 nmi (1,900 km; 1,200 mi) at 19.5 knots.

The ship was armed with a main battery of four 164.7 mm (6.48 in) guns. They were placed in individual sponsons clustered amidships, two guns per broadside. These were supported by a secondary battery of ten 100 mm (3.9 in) guns, which were carried in sponsons, casemates, and individual pivot mounts. For close-range defense against torpedo boats, she carried eight 47 mm (1.9 in) 3-pounder Hotchkiss guns and four 37 mm (1.5 in) 1-pounder guns. She was also armed with two 356 mm (14 in) torpedo tubes in her hull above the waterline. Armor protection consisted of a curved armor deck that was 20 to 40 mm (0.79 to 1.57 in) thick on its sloped sides and 25 mm (1 in) on the flat portion, along with 80 mm (3.1 in) plating on the sides of the conning tower. The main and secondary guns were fitted with 54 mm (2.1 in) gun shields.

== Service history ==
Work on Pascal began with her keel laying in Toulon on 4 December 1893. She was launched on 26 September 1895 and was commissioned to begin sea trials on 20 May 1896. During her initial testing, she was found to suffer from stability problems and had to receive additional ballast to correct the problem. Work on the ship was completed in 1897, and she was placed in full commission for active service on 1 June. On 6 July, she was assigned to the Mediterranean Squadron, based in Toulon. With the beginning of the unrest that led to the Boxer Uprising in Qing China in 1898, many European colonial powers began to reinforce their naval forces in East Asia. Pascal was sent to the region in January 1898 to reinforce the French squadron there, which at that time also included the old ironclad Bayard, the protected cruisers Descartes and Jean Bart, and the unprotected cruiser Duguay-Trouin. In the summer, Pascal and Bayard visited Manila in the Philippines in the aftermath of the Battle of Manila Bay during the Spanish–American War. They were two of many neutral warships from Germany, Britain, Austria-Hungary, and Japan that stopped in the islands to observe the situation and protect their nationals in the city. They were present to witness the fall of Manila to American forces on 13 August.

Pascal remained in East Asian waters in 1899, along with Descartes and Duguay-Trouin, though Jean Bart was recalled home. After the uprising broke out in China late that year, the French considerably strengthened the squadron in the Far East; by January 1901, they had assembled a force of nine cruisers, including Pascal. She remained in East Asian waters in 1902, but with fighting over in China, the unit began to be reduced in size. By 1903, the unit consisted of the armored cruiser Montcalm and the protected cruisers Châteaurenault and Bugeaud, in addition to Pascal. In April that year, Pascal joined a naval review held for the Japanese Emperor Meiji in Kobe, Japan. The foreign naval contingent included the British pre-dreadnought battleship HMS Glory and protected cruiser Blenheim, the German protected cruiser SMS Hansa, the Italian protected cruiser Calabria, and the Russian protected cruiser Askold. Pascal continued to operate in French Indochina in 1904, but she was in poor condition by that time and was unable to steam faster than 16 to 18 knots (30 to 33 km/h; 18 to 21 mph).

In February 1904, she was at Chemulpo Bay, Korea, when the Russo-Japanese War broke out. She and several other neutral warships—including the British cruiser HMS Talbot, the Italian cruiser Elba, and the United States' gunboat USS Vicksburg—observed the Battle of Chemulpo Bay on 9 February. Pascal, Talbot, and Elba cleared for action in the event that the Japanese warships opened fire on them. After the battle ended in a Russian defeat, the three cruisers sent boats to pick up the survivors from the sinking cruiser Varyag and gunboat Korietz. The three cruisers rescued a total of 27 officers and 654 enlisted saved from the two Russian ships; Pascal later evacuated them to Saigon, French Indochina.

Pascal had returned to France by early 1905, and she was placed in reserve at Toulon on 15 February. She was to undergo a major overhaul, but a report dated 12 July determined that by the time work was completed in 1906, the military value of a reconditioned Pascal would be at best mediocre, and so the planned reconstruction was cancelled and the ship lay idle until she was decommissioned on 10 June 1909. She was then struck from the naval register on 24 March 1910 and was placed for sale on 1 August 1911, along with several other older vessels, including the ironclads Amiral Baudin and Magenta and the unprotected cruiser Milan. The ship breaker M. Bénédic purchased Pascal that day and dismantled the ship in La Seyne-sur-Mer in 1912.
