= S. A. Foster House and Stable =

House in Chicago, Illinois

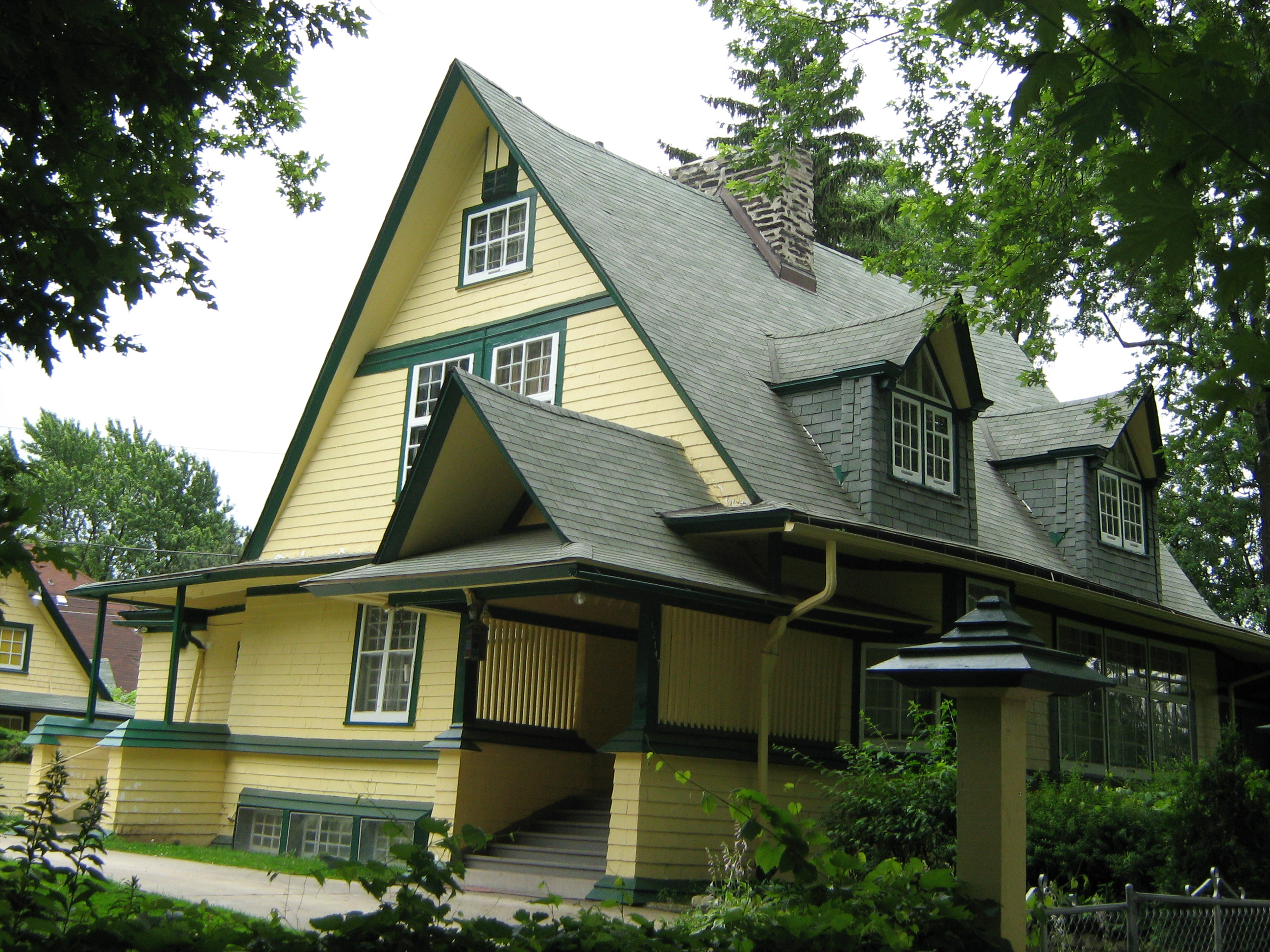
- Interactive map of the S. A. Foster House and Stable area

General information
- Architectural style: Japanese
- Location: 12147 South Harvard Avenue, Chicago, Illinois, United States
- Coordinates: 41°40′22.08″N 87°37′50.16″W
- Completed: 1900
- Client: Stephen A Foster

Design and construction
- Architect: Frank Lloyd Wright

Chicago Landmark
- Designated: May 9, 1996

The Foster House and Stable is a Japanese-influenced house at 12147 South Harvard Avenue in the West Pullman neighborhood of Chicago in Illinois, United States. The house was designed in 1900 by Frank Lloyd Wright as a summer home for Stephen A. Foster, an attorney who worked for real estate developer who helped to build this part of the West Pullman neighborhood. It was designated a Chicago Landmark on May 9, 1996.

The Foster House and Stable were designed during an experimental period by Frank Lloyd Wright and have some rare design features including Japanese-influenced upward roof flares at all of the roof peaks and on each dormer. The house and stable also incorporate an extremely rare tumblehome design throughout. The exterior walls slant inward from the base to the top. Since the interior walls are straight, the transition takes place in the exterior windows and doors which are wider at the bottom than they are at the top. The house and stable are unique examples and similar to wooden water tower construction with flared supports for added strength.

After being on sale for several years, the home sold for $145,000 in March 2020.

== See also ==
- List of Frank Lloyd Wright works
