= French cruiser Jean Bart =

Protected cruiser of the French Navy

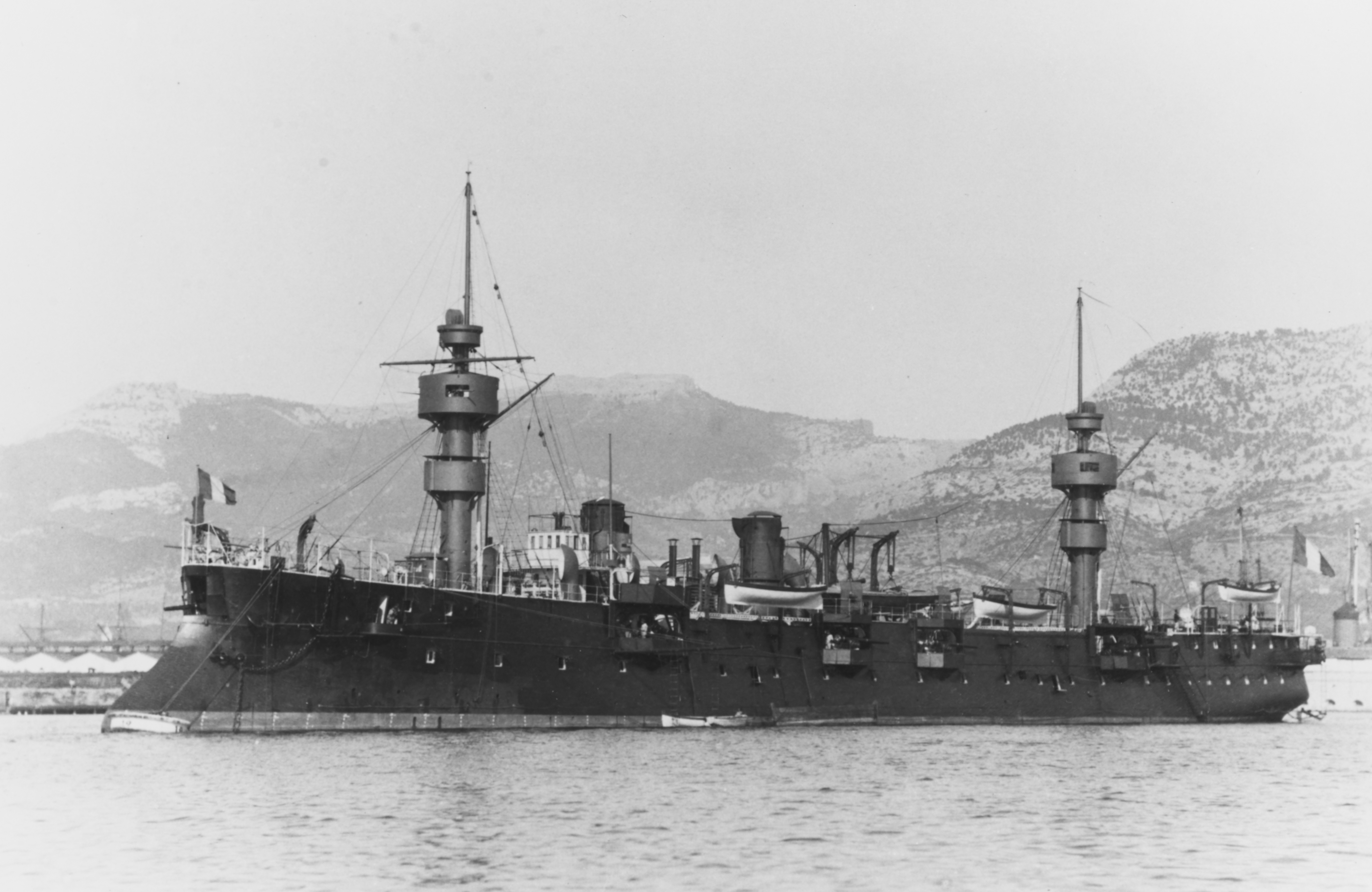
- Jean Bart off Toulon early in her career

History

France
- Name: Jean Bart
- Ordered: 18 September 1886
- Builder: Arsenal de Rochefort
- Laid down: September 1887
- Launched: 24 October 1889
- Commissioned: 5 March 1891
- In service: 5 March 1892
- Stricken: 13 April 1907
- Fate: Wrecked, 11 February 1907

General characteristics
- Class & type: Jean Bart-class cruiser
- Displacement: Normal: 4,165 t (4,099 long tons; 4,591 short tons); Full load: 4,436 t (4,366 long tons; 4,890 short tons)
- Length: 109.6 m (359 ft 7 in) long overall
- Beam: 13.3 m (43 ft 8 in)
- Draft: 6.05 m (19 ft 10 in)
- Installed power: 8 × fire-tube boilers; 8,100 indicated horsepower (6,000 kW)
- Propulsion: 2 × triple-expansion engines; 2 × screw propellers
- Speed: 19 knots (35 km/h; 22 mph)
- Range: 7,014 nmi (12,990 km; 8,072 mi) at 10 knots (19 km/h; 12 mph)
- Complement: 331–405
- Armament: 4 × 164.7 mm (6.48 in) guns; 6 × 138.6 mm (5.46 in) guns; 2 × 65 mm (2.6 in) 9-pounder guns; 6 × 47 mm (1.9 in) guns; 8 × 37 mm (1.5 in) Hotchkiss revolver cannon; 5 × 356 mm (14 in) torpedo tubes
- Armor: Deck: 40 to 90 mm (1.6 to 3.5 in); Conning tower: 80 mm (3.1 in); Gun shields: 54 mm (2.1 in)

Jean Bart was a protected cruiser of the Jean Bart class built for the French Navy in the late 1880s and early 1890s. The lead ship the class of two ships, Jean Bart and her sister ship were ordered during the tenure of Admiral Théophile Aube as Minister of Marine according to the theories of the Jeune École doctrine. The ships were intended as long-range commerce raiders, and they were armed with a main battery of four 164 mm (6.5 in) guns, were protected by an armor deck that was 50 to 100 mm (2 to 4 in) thick, and were capable of steaming at a top speed of 19.5 knots (36.1 km/h; 22.4 mph).

Jean Bart served with the Mediterranean Squadron for the first two years of her career, thereafter being transferred to the Northern Squadron. During this period, she took part in training exercises with the fleet. In 1897, the ship was modernized with new masts and electric search lights. She was deployed to French Indochina in Southeast Asia in 1898 and she was part of the French squadron that responded to the Boxer Uprising in Qing China. Jean Bart underwent a second refit between 1903 and 1906 that included new water-tube boilers that improved her performance. She saw little use afterward, as she ran aground off the Western Sahara in early 1907 and could not be refloated.

== Design ==
Plan and profile drawing of Jean Bart

Design work on the Jean Bart class (Note: A similar cruiser, Alger, that was built at the same time is sometimes considered to be part of the class, which is sometimes referred to as the Alger class. The ships were built to different designs and differed in their particulars significantly.) began in 1885 under the direction of the French naval minister, Charles-Eugène Galiber, who wanted a new commerce raiding protected cruiser similar to the earlier Amiral Cécille, albeit smaller and with a smaller secondary battery. By the time French shipyards had responded to requests for design proposals, Admiral Théophile Aube had replaced Galiber as naval minister, but Aube was an ardent supporter of the Jeune École doctrine that emphasized long-range, commerce raiding cruisers. He called for the construction of six large and ten small protected cruisers, though by the end of his tenure in 1887, the program had been reduced to five large, two medium, and six small cruisers. Aube ordered the first two Jean Bart-class cruisers to fulfill the requirements for the first set of large cruisers, and his successor, Édouard Barbey, authorized the third. (Note: The second of the three, to have been named Dupuy de Lôme, was cancelled before work began, leaving just two ships in the class.) The two Jean Barts proved to be the last of the initial series of commerce raiders built under the influence of the Jeune École.

Jean Bart was 105 m (344 ft 6 in) long between perpendiculars, with a beam of 12.98 m (42 ft 7 in) and a draft of 6.10 to 6.45 m (20 ft 0 in to 21 ft 2 in). She displaced 4,044 long tons (4,109 t). Her crew varied over the course of her career, amounting to 387–405 officers and enlisted men. The ship's propulsion system consisted of a pair of triple-expansion steam engines driving two screw propellers. Steam was provided by eight coal-burning fire-tube boilers that were ducted into two funnels. Her machinery was rated to produce 8,000 indicated horsepower (6,000 kW) for a top speed of 19 to 19.5 knots (35.2 to 36.1 km/h; 21.9 to 22.4 mph). She had a cruising radius of 3,200 nautical miles (5,900 km; 3,700 mi) at 10 knots (19 km/h; 12 mph).

The ship was armed with a main battery of four 164.7 mm (6.48 in) 28-caliber guns and a secondary battery of six 138.6 mm (5.46 in) 30-cal. guns. All of these guns were placed in individual pivot mounts; the 164.7 mm guns were in sponsons located fore and aft, with two guns per broadside. Four of the 138.6 mm guns were in sponsons between the 164.7 mm guns, one was in an embrasure in the forecastle and the last was in a swivel mount on the stern. For close-range defense against torpedo boats, she carried a pair of 65 mm (2.6 in) 9-pounder guns, six 47 mm (1.9 in) 3-pounder Hotchkiss guns, and eight 37 mm (1.5 in) Hotchkiss revolver cannon. She was also armed with five 356 mm (14 in) torpedo tubes in her hull above the waterline. Armor protection consisted of a curved armor deck that was 40 to 90 mm (2 to 4 in) thick, along with 80 mm (3 in) plating on the conning tower. The main and secondary guns received 54 mm (2.1 in) thick gun shields.

=== Modifications ===
In 1893–1894, Jean Bart was rearmed with M1884 quick-firing guns for her main battery; her secondary 138.6 mm guns were partially replaced: the bow and forward pair of broadside guns were replaced with M1884 versions while the remainder remained the M1881 version but converted to quick firing. During another refit in 1896–1897, the ship's military masts were shortened to reduce topweight, with light pole masts placed atop the shortened masts. Her bow torpedo tubes were removed at this time as well. A third modernization in 1903–1905 saw the ship re-boilered with twelve Niclausse boilers and her light armament was revised to two 65 mm guns and ten 47 mm guns.

== Service history ==
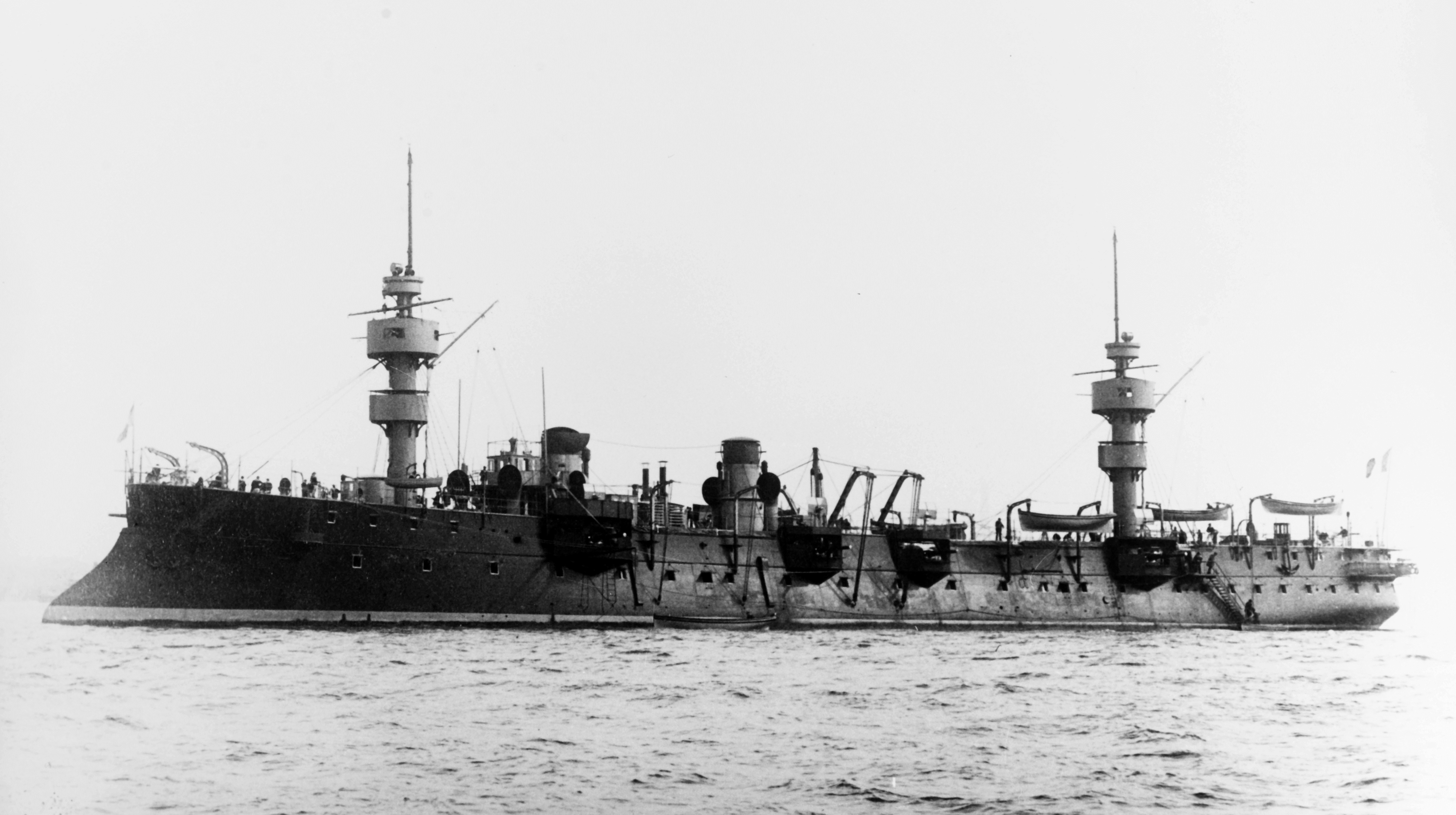
Jean Bart at the Columbian Naval Review in April 1893

The contract for Jean Bart was awarded to the Arsenal de Rochefort shipyard in Rochefort on 18 September 1886 and the order for her engines was placed on 19 November with Indret. She was placed on the navy's list in January 1887, and work on Jean Bart began with her keel laying in September 1887. She was launched on 24 October 1889 and was commissioned to begin sea trials on 5 March 1891. Her initial tests were approved on 8 October, and ten days later she departed for Toulon, where further trials were carried out. These lasted until 5 March 1892, when she was placed in full commission for active service. The same day, she was assigned to the reserve squadron of the Mediterranean Squadron, the main French battle fleet, based in Toulon. In early 1893, Jean Bart visited the United States in company with the unprotected cruiser Aréthuse and the aviso Hussard for the international Columbian Naval Review held off New York on 27 April 1893. After returning to France, Jean Bart was rearmed with quick-firing guns between May 1893 and February 1894.

During that period in 1893, Jean Bart was transferred to the active component of the Mediterranean Squadron. At that time, the unit also included several modern ironclad warships, the armored cruiser Dupuy de Lome, and the protected cruisers Amiral Cécille, Cosmao, Troude, and Lalande. In 1894, she continued to operate with the squadron. She took part in annual training exercises that year to evaluate the effectiveness of the French coastal defense system. The squadron went to sea on 15 July and began the operations the next day, which lasted until 29 July; during operations on the 18th, Jean Bart collided with the torpedo boat Grondeur. She was not damaged, but Grondeur suffered damage to her bow and had to return to port for repairs. The maneuvers demonstrated the usefulness of torpedo boat flotillas in coastal defense, but highlighted that France's coastal defense system in the English Channel was not yet complete.

Jean Bart later in her career

In 1895, she was transferred to the Northern Squadron, which was kept in commission for only four months per year. The unit at that time consisted of the coastal defense ship Furieux, the ironclads Requin, Victorieuse, and Suffren, the armored cruiser Latouche-Tréville, and the protected cruisers Coëtlogon and Surcouf. By 1896, she was reduced to the 2nd category of reserve, along with several old coastal defense ships, ironclads, and other cruisers. They were retained in a state that allowed them to be mobilized in the event of a major war. While out of service in 1897, the ship was refitted, which included replacing her military masts with lighter pole masts; the French reasoned that the smaller masts would make her less visible at a distance. The light guns that had been carried in the military masts' tops were relocated to her upper deck and superstructure. Electric search lights were installed on the pole masts.

With the beginning of the unrest that led to the Boxer Uprising in Qing China in 1898, many European colonial powers began to reinforce their naval forces in East Asia. Jean Bart was mobilized that year and sent to the region, and at that time, the French squadron in the Far East consisted of the old ironclad Bayard, the protected cruisers Descartes and Pascal, and the unprotected cruiser Duguay-Trouin. Jean Bart remained on station in East Asia through early 1901; at that time, eight other cruisers were assigned to the station. By May, Jean Bart had been recalled to France, where she was reduced to reserve in Lorient. The ship was extensively modernized in Lorient in 1903, the most significant improvement being the replacement of her original boilers with Niclausse-type water-tube boilers, which increased her performance to 20 knots (37 km/h; 23 mph) from 10,000 indicated horsepower (7,500 kW). The work was carried out between 17 February 1903 and 20 July 1905, and she conducted sea trials in October.

On 11 February 1907, Jean Bart was wrecked off the coast of Spanish Sahara, near Cape Blanc. The ship had been steaming in heavy fog and struck an uncharted reef. The crew remained aboard, attempting to free the ship, before the hull broke in half on 23 February; the last of her crew remained aboard the wreck until 2 April. Salvage rights were sold to Blandy Brothers of Las Palmas, and Jean Bart was struck from the naval register on 13 April. This was the first in a series of disasters for the French Navy that year, which also included the wrecking of the armored cruiser Chanzy off the coast of China and the destruction of the pre-dreadnought battleship Iéna by an accidental magazine fire. The captains of both cruisers were both brought before courts-martial, both convicted of negligent ship handling, and both barred from further commands for three years. Scrapping work continued for several years, and parts of the wreck were still present by March 1914.
