= French cruiser Descartes =

Protected cruiser of the French Navy

- Descartes's sister ship Pascal, c. 1897–1900

History

France
- Name: Descartes
- Ordered: 17 August 1892
- Builder: Ateliers et Chantiers de la Loire
- Laid down: January 1893
- Launched: 27 September 1894
- Commissioned: 12 February 1896
- Decommissioned: 15 June 1917
- In service: 1 January 1897
- Stricken: 10 May 1920
- Fate: Broken up, 1921

General characteristics
- Class & type: Descartes-class cruiser
- Displacement: 4,005 t (3,942 long tons; 4,415 short tons)
- Length: 100.7 m (330 ft 5 in) loa
- Beam: 12.95 m (42 ft 6 in)
- Draft: 6.01 m (19 ft 9 in)
- Installed power: 16 × water-tube boilers; 8,300 ihp (6,200 kW)
- Propulsion: 2 × triple-expansion steam engines; 2 × screw propellers
- Speed: 19 knots (35 km/h; 22 mph)
- Complement: 383–401
- Armament: 4 × 164.7 mm (6.48 in) guns; 10 × 100 mm (3.9 in) guns; 8 × 47 mm (1.9 in) guns; 4 × 37 mm (1.5 in) guns; 2 × 356 mm (14 in) torpedo tubes
- Armor: Deck: 20 to 40 mm (0.79 to 1.57 in); Conning tower: 80 mm (3 in); Gun shields: 54 mm (2.1 in)

Descartes was the lead ship of the Descartes class of protected cruisers built for the French Navy in the 1890s. The Descartes-class cruisers were ordered as part of a construction program directed at strengthening the fleet's cruiser force. At the time, France was concerned with the growing naval threat of the Italian and German fleets, and the new cruisers were intended to serve with the main fleet, and overseas in the French colonial empire. Descartes was armed with a main battery of four 164.7 mm (6.5 in) guns, was protected by an armor deck that was 20 to 40 mm (0.79 to 1.57 in) thick, and was capable of steaming at a top speed of 19 knots (35 km/h; 22 mph).

Descartes served overseas in French Indochina for much of her career, being sent there immediately after entering service in 1897. She was present in the region during the Boxer Uprising in Qing China in 1900. After returning to France in 1902, she was assigned to the North Atlantic station with several other cruisers. The ship made a second deployment to East Asia in 1905, later being briefly stationed in Madagascar in 1907, before returning for a tour with the Mediterranean Squadron that year. Descartes was then transferred to the Northern Squadron. By 1914, the ship was operating with the Division de l'Atlantique (Division of the Atlantic) and was in Central American waters when World War I started in July. She joined the unsuccessful search for the German cruiser SMS Karlsruhe in August, and spent the next three years patrolling the West Indies. She was decommissioned and disarmed in 1917, her guns being used as field artillery and to arm patrol vessels. She was struck from the naval register in 1920 and sold to ship breakers the following year.

== Design ==
Plan and profile drawing of the Descartes class

In response to a war scare with Italy in the late 1880s, the French Navy embarked on a major construction program in 1890 to counter the threat of the Italian fleet and that of Italy's ally Germany. The plan called for a total of seventy cruisers for use in home waters and overseas in the French colonial empire. The Descartes class—Descartes and Pascal—was ordered to as part of the program. The design for the Descartes class was based on the earlier cruiser Davout, but was enlarged to incorporate a more powerful gun armament.

Descartes was 100.7 m (330 ft 5 in) long overall, with a beam of 12.95 m (42 ft 6 in) and an average draft of 6.01 m (19 ft 9 in). She displaced 4,005 t (3,942 long tons; 4,415 short tons) as designed. Her crew varied over the course of her career, and consisted of 383–401 officers and enlisted men. The ship's propulsion system consisted of a pair of triple-expansion steam engines driving two screw propellers. Steam was provided by sixteen coal-burning Belleville-type water-tube boilers that were ducted into two funnels. Her machinery was rated to produce 8,300 indicated horsepower (6,200 kW) for a top speed of 19 knots (35 km/h; 22 mph), but she exceeded these figures on trials, reaching 19.59 knots (36.28 km/h; 22.54 mph) from 8,828 ihp (6,583 kW). She had a cruising radius of 5,500 nautical miles (10,200 km; 6,300 mi) at 10 knots (19 km/h; 12 mph) and 1,000 nmi (1,900 km; 1,200 mi) at 19.5 knots.

The ship was armed with a main battery of four 164.7 mm (6.48 in) guns. They were placed in individual sponsons clustered amidships, two guns per broadside. These were supported by a secondary battery of ten 100 mm (3.9 in) guns, which were carried in sponsons, casemates, and individual pivot mounts. For close-range defense against torpedo boats, she carried eight 47 mm (1.9 in) 3-pounder Hotchkiss guns and four 37 mm (1.5 in) 1-pounder guns. She was also armed with two 356 mm (14 in) torpedo tubes in her hull above the waterline. Armor protection consisted of a curved armor deck that was 20 to 40 mm (0.79 to 1.57 in) thick on its sloped sides and 25 mm (1 in) on the flat portion, along with 80 mm (3.1 in) plating on the sides of the conning tower. The main and secondary guns were fitted with 54 mm (2.1 in) gun shields.

=== Modifications ===
Descartes underwent a series of modifications over the course of her construction and career. While the ship was being built in June 1893, the originally planned 450 mm (17.7 in) torpedo tubes were replaced with 356 mm tubes. In June 1894, the military masts that had been intended to be installed were cancelled in favor of lighter pole masts. And in late 1896, while she was still undergoing her initial testing, her funnels were shortened by 1 m (3 ft 3 in).

In 1908, she had her torpedo tubes removed. Her forward set of boilers were limited to 10 kg/cm^{2} (140 psi) after a boiler explosion killed a crewman. A second accident with one of her aft boilers the following year prompted those to be modified to the lower pressure in 1909. During World War I, the ship progressively lost most of her armament as guns were removed for other purposes. Two of her 47 mm guns and two 37 mm guns were placed ashore in Fort de France to strengthen the harbor defenses in 1916. Early the next year, two of her 100 mm guns were removed to be installed aboard the cruiser Cosmao, and then in March, she was almost entirely disarmed so those guns could be used in other ships or converted into field artillery. At that time, she retained only the forward two 164.7 mm guns and two 37 mm guns.

== Service history ==
Descartes was built by the Ateliers et Chantiers de la Loire shipyard in Nantes; she was ordered on 17 August 1892 and her keel was laid down in late January 1893. She was launched on 27 September 1894, and after completing fitting out, she was moved to Brest on 3 February 1896. She was commissioned to begin sea trials there on 12 February. On 28 August, she sailed to Cherbourg to be present for the visit of Tsar Nicholas II of Russia the following day. During her initial trials, Descartes reportedly reached a top speed of 21.8 knots (40.4 km/h; 25.1 mph). The ship was found to suffer from stability problems and had to receive additional ballast to correct the problem. Her funnels were also altered. She was decommissioned at Brest for the modifications to be carried out. After this work was completed, Descartes was placed in full commission on 1 January 1897. She was immediately deployed to the colony of French Indochina in Southeast Asia, departing on 25 January. There, she joined the old ironclad Bayard, the protected cruiser Isly, and the unprotected cruiser Éclaireur.

With the beginning of the unrest in 1898 that led to the Boxer Uprising in Qing China, many European colonial powers began to reinforce their naval forces in East Asia. The French squadron was accordingly strengthened by Descartes's sister ship Pascal, Jean Bart, and the unprotected cruiser Duguay-Trouin; the latter two replaced Isly and Éclaireur. Descartes remained in East Asian waters in 1899, along with Pascal and Duguay-Trouin, though Jean Bart was recalled home. On 25 October 1900, an accidental propellant fire occurred aboard Descartes, part of a series of fires that resulted from unstable Poudre B charges. Descartes and Pascal had been deployed to East Asia by January 1901 as part of the response to the Boxer Uprising; at that time, seven other cruisers were assigned to the station in addition to the two Descartes-class ships. In early 1902, she was serving with the North Atlantic station, serving with the cruisers D'Estrées, Suchet, and Tage. But in February that year, she was placed in reserve at Toulon, and she remained out of service through August 1904.

After returning to service that year, Descartes returned for another tour in the Far East. On the voyage there, she escorted the destroyers Francisque and Sabre and ten torpedo boats. In May 1906, Descartes visited Nanking, laying there on the 18th in company with the Italian cruiser Calabria and the German gunboat SMS Vorwärts. She remained there through 1907, by which time the unit consisted of the large protected cruiser D'Entrecasteaux, the armored cruisers Bruix and Chanzy, and the smaller protected cruisers Alger and Catinat. During the year, Descartes was detached from the main squadron to patrol the East Indies, based in Madagascar. She returned to France later that year for service with the Mediterranean Squadron, but upon being recommissioned at Toulon on 5 December, she was assigned to the newly created 3rd Division of the Northern Squadron, along with the cruiser Chasseloup-Laubat and the armored cruiser Kléber. In 1908, Descartes was used to support the gunnery school aboard the old ironclad Couronne and later the training ship Gironde. Descartes was replaced by the coastal defense ship Requin in January 1910. Descartes then returned to the Northern Squadron in 1911 and she was assigned to patrolling the fishing grounds off Newfoundland.

Beginning in 1912, Descartes was stationed in the Caribbean Sea, where she would remain for the next four years. By 1914, Descartes was assigned to the Division de l'Atlantique (Division of the Atlantic), along with the armored cruiser Condé and the protected cruiser Friant. Descartes and Condé had been at Veracruz, Mexico, on 30 July when they were recalled home as World War I broke out in Europe. The declaration of war between France and Germany on 4 August interrupted these plans, and the next day, the French ships were assigned to the British 4th Cruiser Squadron to join the unsuccessful hunt for the German light cruiser SMS Karlsruhe, which was known to be in the area. She patrolled the West Indies from 1914 to 1917; during this period she was involved in two collisions with merchant vessels. The first was with the Spanish freighter Telesfora and the second was with the British steamer SS Strathmore. After returning home in February 1917, she was placed in reserve in Lorient and was she was decommissioned on 15 June. There, she was disarmed. Her 164 mm guns were converted for use by the French Army, while the 100 mm guns were used to arm anti-submarine patrol vessels. The ship was then converted into a mooring hulk, replacing the old armored cruiser Dupuy de Lôme on 28 August 1918. Descartes was eventually stricken from the naval register on 10 May 1920 and sold to the ship breaker M. Jacquart on 10 May 1921 to be scrapped.
