= Tumblehome =

Design element of ships and automobiles

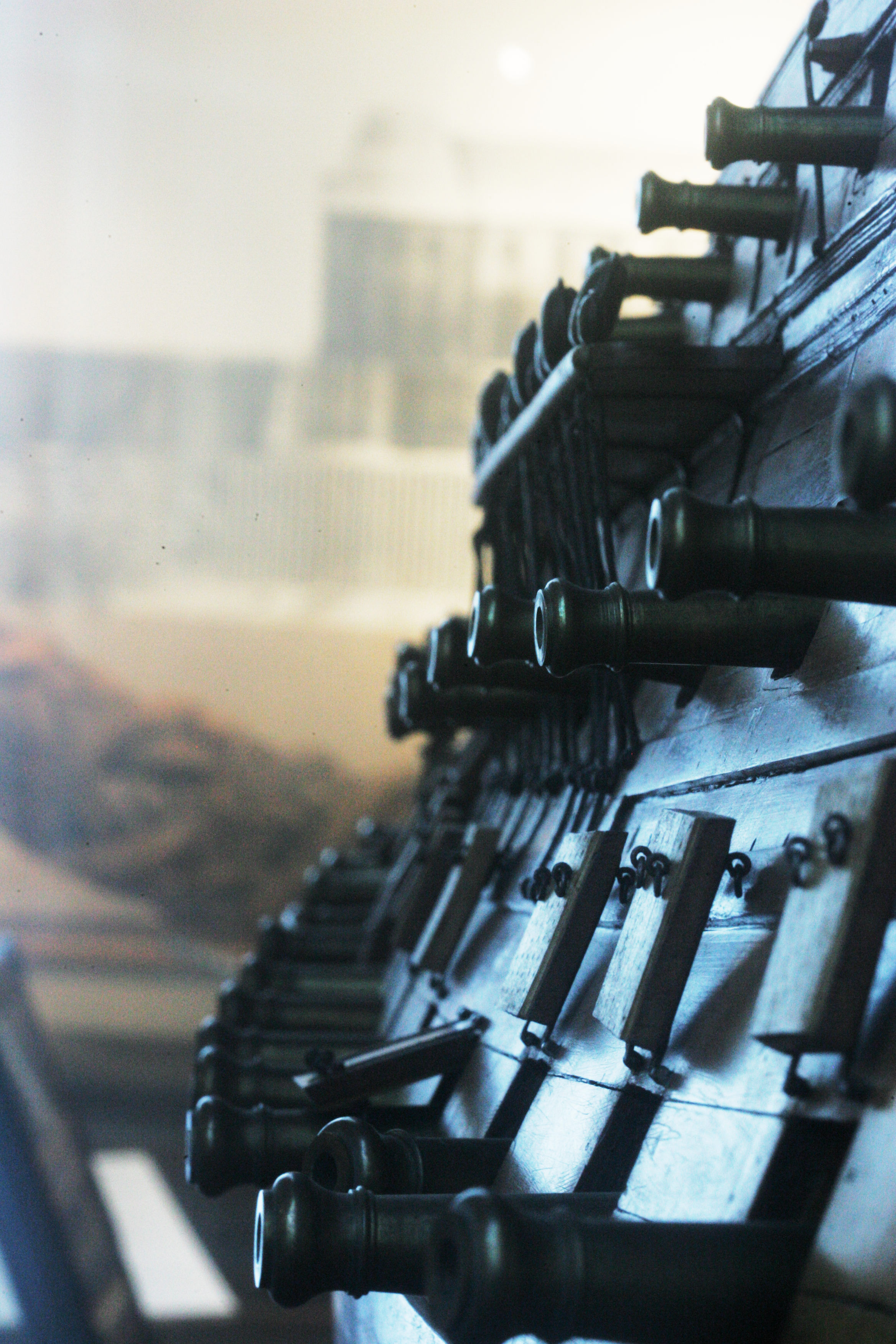
Model of a French 74-gun ship from 1755 showing tumblehome as its hull narrows rising to the upper deck

Tumblehome or tumble home is the narrowing of a hull above the waterline, giving less beam at the level of the main deck. The opposite of tumblehome is flare.

A small amount of tumblehome is normal in many naval architecture designs in order to allow any small projections at deck level to clear wharves.

In automotive design, tumblehome sides taper inward as they go up. This includes a roof tapering in, and curved window glass.

== Origins ==
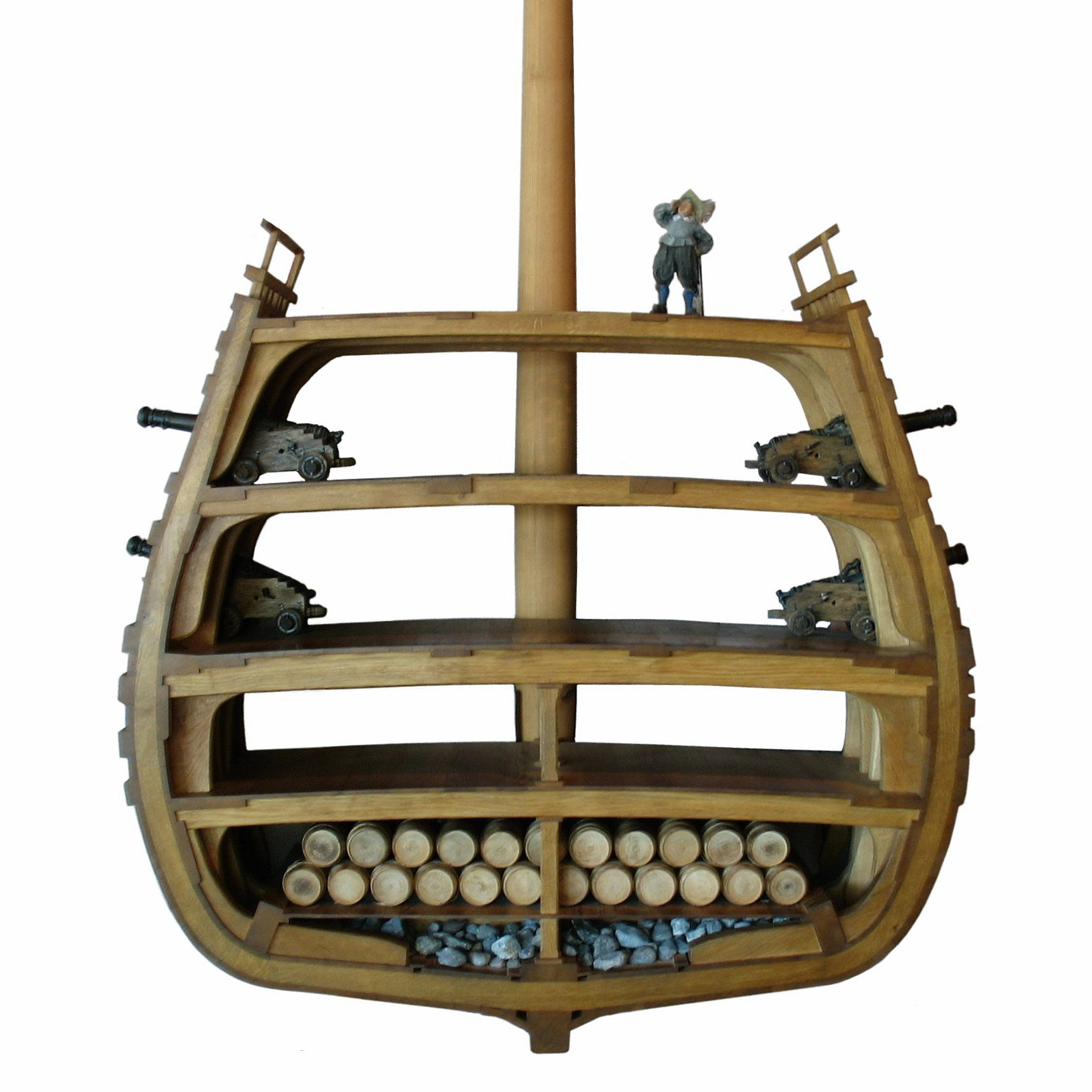
Model showing the cross-section of Vasa, demonstrating the hull shape created by tumblehome

Tumblehome was common in sailing vessels, particularly in the latter part of the 16th century. It allowed for maximizing a vessel's beam and creating a low centre of gravity (by decreasing the amount of structure, and therefore mass, at deck level), both tending to maximize stability. In the era of oared combat ships it was quite common, placing the oar ports as far abeam as possible, allowing maximum possible manpower to be brought to bear.

Inward-sloping sides made boarding a vessel by force more difficult, as the ships would come to contact at their widest points, with the decks some distance apart. With the advent of gunpowder, extreme tumblehome also increased the effective thickness of the hull versus flat horizontal trajectory gunfire (as material grows effectively "thicker" as it is tilted towards the horizontal) and increased the likelihood of a shell striking the hull being deflected—much the same reasons that later tank armour became sloped.

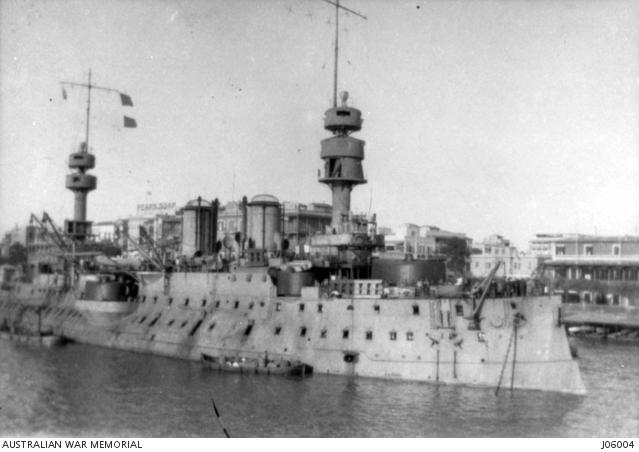
French battleship Jauréguiberry of 1891, showing pronounced tumblehome amidships.

Steel warships especially of the early 1880s frequently demonstrate tumblehome, though it has been an influential factor in their design ever since their beginnings. One of the first ironclad warships, the CSS Virginia of 1862, could be considered an early example of this. The French Navy in particular promoted the design, advocating it to reduce the weight of the superstructure and increase seaworthiness by creating greater freeboard. A French yard was contracted to construct the pre-dreadnought battleship Tsesarevich along the lines of France's Jauréguiberry. Tsesarevich was delivered to the Russian Imperial Navy in time for it to fight as Admiral Wilgelm Vitgeft's flagship at the Battle of the Yellow Sea on 10 August 1904. The Russo-Japanese War proved that the tumblehome battleship design was excellent for long-distance navigation, but could be dangerously unstable when watertight integrity was breached. Four tumblehome Borodino-class battleships, which had been built in Russian yards to Tsesarevich's basic design, fought on 27 May 1905 at Tsushima. When three of the four were lost, the tumblehome design was largely abandoned for the remainder of the 20th century.

Another example of tumblehome hull design were the Dutch fluyt, 17th-century cargo sailing vessels. Fluyt ships were designed to facilitate transoceanic delivery of cargo with maximum of cargospace and crew efficiency. Unlike rivals, they were not built for conversion in wartime to a warship, and so were cheaper to build and carried more than twice the cargo of a conventional vessel and could be handled by a much smaller crew. These factors resulted in a lower cost of transportation by Dutch merchants, giving them a major competitive advantage.

== Modern warship design ==
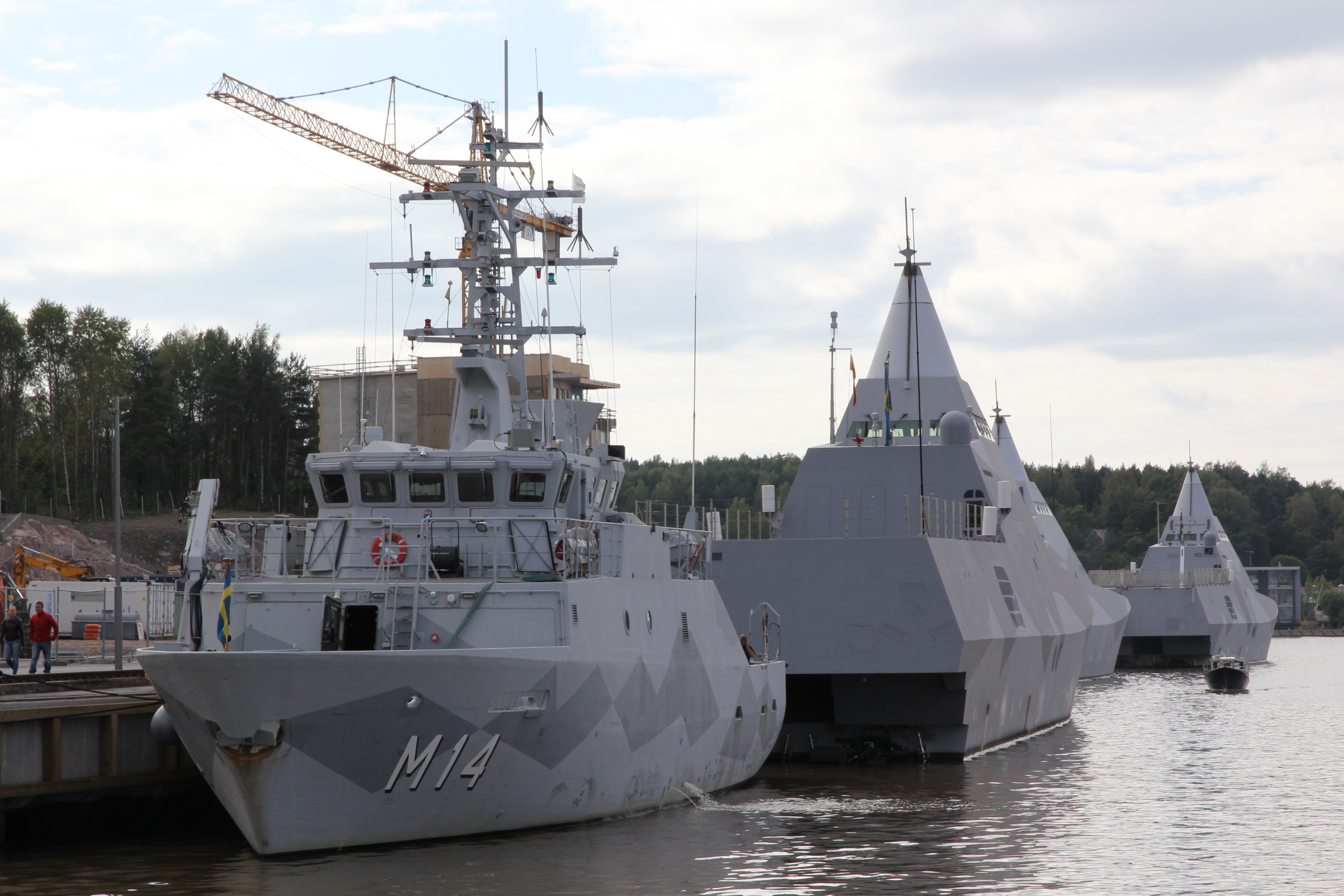
Comparison of conventional hull and the Visby-class corvette

Tumblehome has been used in proposals for several modern ship projects. The hull form in combination with choice of materials results in decreased radar reflection, which together with other signature (sound, heat etc.) damping measures makes stealth ships. This faceted appearance is a common application of the principles of stealth aircraft. Most designs feature tumblehome only above deck level; the US Navy's Zumwalt-class destroyers demonstrate it above and below the waterline.

Due to stability concerns, most warships with narrow wave-piercing hulls combine tumblehome with multi-hull designs, such as the Type 022 missile boat.

== In narrowboat design ==
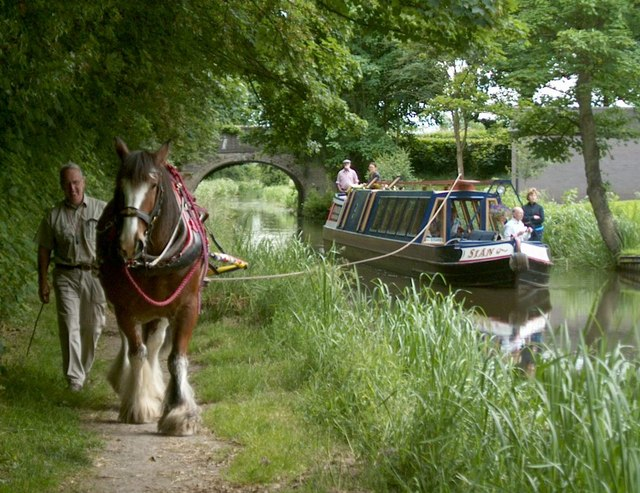
Pronounced tumblehome only on the superstructure of this narrowboat

The inward slope of a narrowboat's superstructure (from gunwales to roof) is referred to as tumblehome. The amount of tumblehome is one of the key design choices when specifying a narrowboat, because the widest part of a narrowboat is rarely more than 7 feet across, so even a modest change to the slope of the cabin sides makes a significant difference to the "full-height" width of the cabin interior.

== In automobile design ==
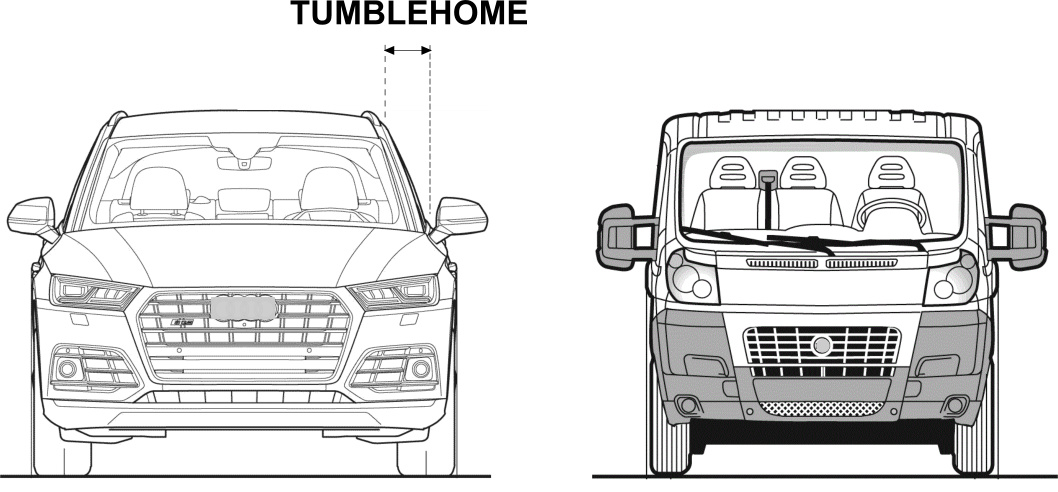
Tumblehome differs between passenger and commercial motor vehicles

The inward slope of the "greenhouse" above the beltline of a motor vehicle is also called the tumblehome. An example of a car with a pronounced tumblehome is the Lamborghini Countach. Less commonly, the inward curve of the body near the bottom may also be called a tumblehome. In 21st century automobile designs this turnunder is less pronounced or eliminated to reduce aerodynamic drag and to help keep the lower portions of the vehicle cleaner under wet conditions.

It is known in bus body design as well.

== In house design ==
The S. A. Foster House and Stable were designed during an experimental period by Frank Lloyd Wright in 1900 and have rare design features including Japanese-influenced upward roof flares at all of the roof peaks and on each dormer. The house and stable also incorporate a tumblehome design throughout. The exterior walls slant inward from the base to the top. Since the interior walls are straight, the transition takes place in the exterior windows and doors which are wider at the bottom than they are at the top. The house and stable are unique examples and similar to wooden water tower construction with flared supports for added strength.
