= Charles-Eugène Galiber =

French naval officer and politician

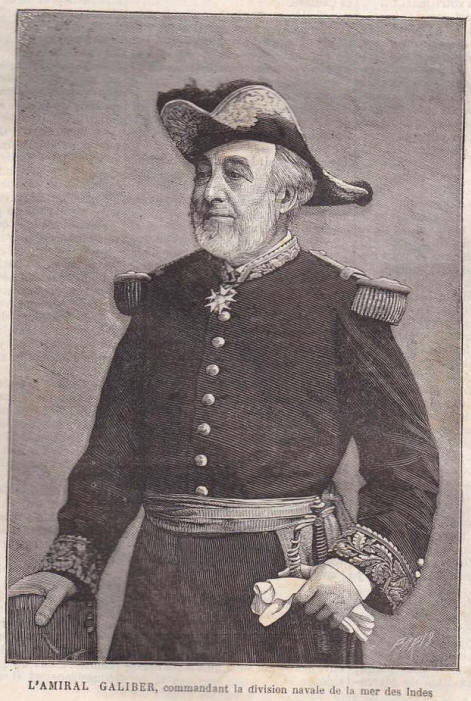
Charles-Eugène Galiber

Charles-Eugène Galiber (2 July 1824, Castres – 25 January 1909, Paris) was a French naval officer and politician. His final rank was vice admiral and from 1885 to 1886 he served as Minister for the Navy and the Colonies.

== Sources ==
- http://ecole.nav.traditions.free.fr/officiers_galiber_charles.htm
