= French ship Protet =

At least two ships of the French Navy have been named Protet:

- French cruiser Protet, a Catinat-class cruiser launched in 1898 and struck in 1910.
- French destroyer Protet, a Bisson-class destroyer launched in 1913 and scrapped in 1933.
