= French cruiser Catinat =

Protected cruiser of the French Navy

- Catinat

History

France
- Name: Catinat
- Ordered: 14 February 1894
- Builder: Société Nouvelle des Forges et Chantiers de la Méditerranée
- Laid down: February 1894
- Launched: 8 October 1896
- Commissioned: 12 May 1897
- Decommissioned: 16 February 1910
- Stricken: 3 August 1910
- Fate: Broken up, 1911

General characteristics
- Class & type: Catinat-class cruiser
- Displacement: 4,113.65 t (4,048.68 long tons; 4,534.52 short tons)
- Length: 101.56 m (333 ft 2 in) loa
- Beam: 13.6 m (44 ft 7 in)
- Draft: 6 m (19 ft 8 in)
- Installed power: 16 × water-tube boilers; 9,500 ihp (7,100 kW)
- Propulsion: 2 × triple-expansion steam engines; 2 × screw propellers
- Speed: 19 knots (35 km/h; 22 mph)
- Range: 6,000 nmi (11,000 km; 6,900 mi) at 10 kn (19 km/h; 12 mph)
- Complement: 399
- Armament: 4 × 164 mm (6.5 in) guns; 10 × 100 mm (3.9 in) guns; 10 × 47 mm (1.9 in) guns; 4 × 37 mm (1.5 in) guns; 2 × 356 mm (14.0 in) torpedo tubes
- Armor: Deck: 25 to 40 mm (0.98 to 1.57 in); Conning tower: 80 mm (3 in)

Catinat was the lead ship of the Catinat class of protected cruisers built for the French Navy in the 1890s. The Catinat-class cruisers were ordered as part of a construction program directed at strengthening the fleet's cruiser force at a time the country was concerned with the growing naval threat of the Italian and German fleets. The new cruisers were intended to serve with the main fleet and overseas in the French colonial empire. Catinat was armed with a main battery of four 164 mm (6.5 in) guns, was protected by an armor deck that was 25 to 60 mm (0.98 to 2.36 in) thick, and was capable of steaming at a top speed of up to 20 knots (37 km/h; 23 mph).

Completed in 1898, Catinat initially served with the Northern Squadron, where she conducted training exercises with the rest of the unit. She served in the unit for less than a year before being reduced to the reserve fleet. She was assigned to the Indian Ocean by 1901, remaining there for the next several years. By 1906, she had been transferred to France's colonies in the Pacific. Her career overseas was uneventful, and by 1911, she was struck off the naval register and thereafter sold for scrap.

== Design ==
In response to a war scare with Italy in the late 1880s, the French Navy embarked on a major construction program in 1890 to counter the threat of the Italian fleet and that of Italy's ally Germany. The plan called for a total of seventy cruisers for use in home waters and overseas in the French colonial empire. The Catinat class was ordered as part of the program, and they were based on the earlier Friant class. Catinat and Protet were poorly ventilated for vessels that were intended on lengthy voyages in the overseas empire.

Catinat was 101.56 m (333 ft 2 in) long overall, with a beam of 13.6 m (44 ft 7 in) and a draft of 6 m (19 ft 8 in). She displaced 4,113.65 t (4,048.68 long tons; 4,534.52 short tons). Her crew numbered 399 officers and enlisted men. The ship's propulsion system consisted of a pair of triple-expansion steam engines driving two screw propellers. Steam was provided by sixteen coal-burning Belleville-type water-tube boilers that were ducted into two funnels. Her machinery was rated to produce 9,500 indicated horsepower (7,100 kW) for a top speed of 19 knots (35 km/h; 22 mph), though she exceeded this speed on sea trials. She had a cruising range of 6,000 nautical miles (11,000 km; 6,900 mi) at a speed of 10 knots (19 km/h; 12 mph).

The ship was armed with a main battery of four 164 mm (6.5 in) guns. They were placed in individual sponsons clustered amidships, two guns per broadside. These were supported by a secondary battery of ten 100 mm (3.9 in) guns, which were carried in sponsons, casemates, and pivot mounts. For close-range defense against torpedo boats, she carried ten 47 mm (1.9 in) 3-pounder Hotchkiss guns and four 37 mm (1.5 in) 1-pounder guns. She was also armed with two 356 mm (14 in) torpedo tubes in her hull above the waterline. Armor protection consisted of a curved armor deck that was 25 to 40 mm (0.98 to 1.57 in) thick, along with 80 mm (3.1 in) plating on the conning tower.

== Service history ==
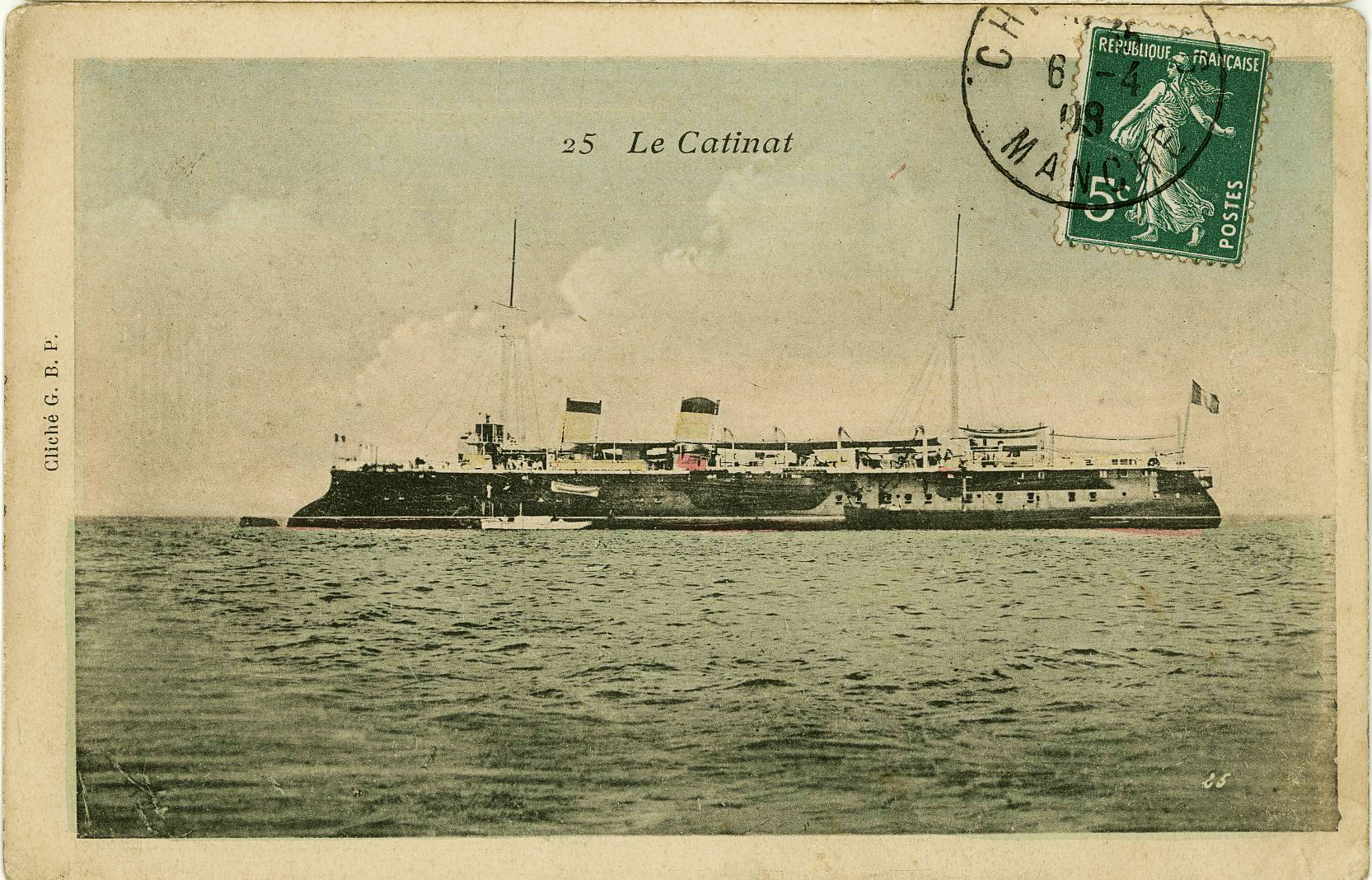
Postcard depicting Catinat

The contract for the ship was awarded to the Société Nouvelle des Forges et Chantiers de la Méditerranée shipyard in Le Havre on 14 February 1894, with delivery due by February 1897. Work on Catinat began with her keel laying later that month. She was launched on 8 October 1896 and was moved to Cherbourg, where she was commissioned to begin sea trials six days later. These lasted until 27 Mar 1898, when she was placed in full commission for active service. She then sailed to Brest on 1 June to join the Escadre du Nord (Northern Squadron), where she replaced the cruiser Friant.

Catinat entered service in time to participate in the annual fleet maneuvers with the Northern Squadron in July and August 1898. The exercises took part in three stages; the first, a simulated blockade of the Baie de Douarnenez ended in the squadron's failure to contain the cruiser Surcouf and nine torpedo boats. The second consisted of an attack on the fortifications of Brest, and the third saw the fleet conduct an amphibious assault near Douarnenez. While cruising off Boulogne on 17 August, the coastal defense ship Valmy ran aground and Catinat, the next vessel astern, was unable to turn in time to avoid colliding with her. Neither ship was seriously damaged in the accident, however, and Valmy was quickly re-floated.

Catinat initially remained assigned to the Northern Squadron in 1899. The unit was based in the English Channel, and at that time it consisted of six of the French Navy's older ironclads, a pair of armored cruisers, the protected cruiser Surcouf, and three smaller cruisers. Catinat's tenure in the unit was brief, as she was reduced to the 2nd category of reserve by March, less than a year after completing her trials.

By January 1901, Catinat had been reactivated and assigned to the Naval Division of the Indian Ocean, which also included the unprotected cruisers D'Estaing and Nielly and the gunboat Scorpion. Catinat served as the flagship on the unit, which was stationed in Madagascar. She remained on the station in 1902 in company with the cruiser Infernet. By 1903, Catinat returned to France and was again placed in reserve for an overhaul at Lorient. The ship was left there idle for some twenty-seven months. On 15 February 1905, she was recommissioned at Lorient for another tour overseas, this time to France's colonial holdings in the Pacific Ocean. During a tour of the region in 1906, Catinat visited San Diego, California, in the United States in July. She exchanged salutes with the coastal fortification outside the city, along with visits with the commanding officer of the fort.

She remained in the unit in 1907, by which time it had been amalgamated into the Far East Division, though Catinat continued to patrol France's colonies in the Pacific. In July, she received new funnels at Sydney, Australia, after the aft funnel nearly collapsed. She remained on station in the Pacific in 1908, and in the two preceding years, she steamed a total of 75,000 nautical miles (139,000 km; 86,000 mi). That year, the independent Pacific Naval Division was reestablished, with Catinat as its flagship; the unit also included the sloop Kersaint, the gunboat Zélée, and a pair of transports. After arriving back in France, Catinat was placed in special reserve at Rochefort on 29 July 1909. It was determined that repairs to the ship were too expensive, and so on 16 February 1910, she was decommissioned. She was struck from the naval register on 3 August and was subsequently sold to ship breakers on 17 July 1911.
