= Catinat-class cruiser =

Protected cruiser class of the French Navy

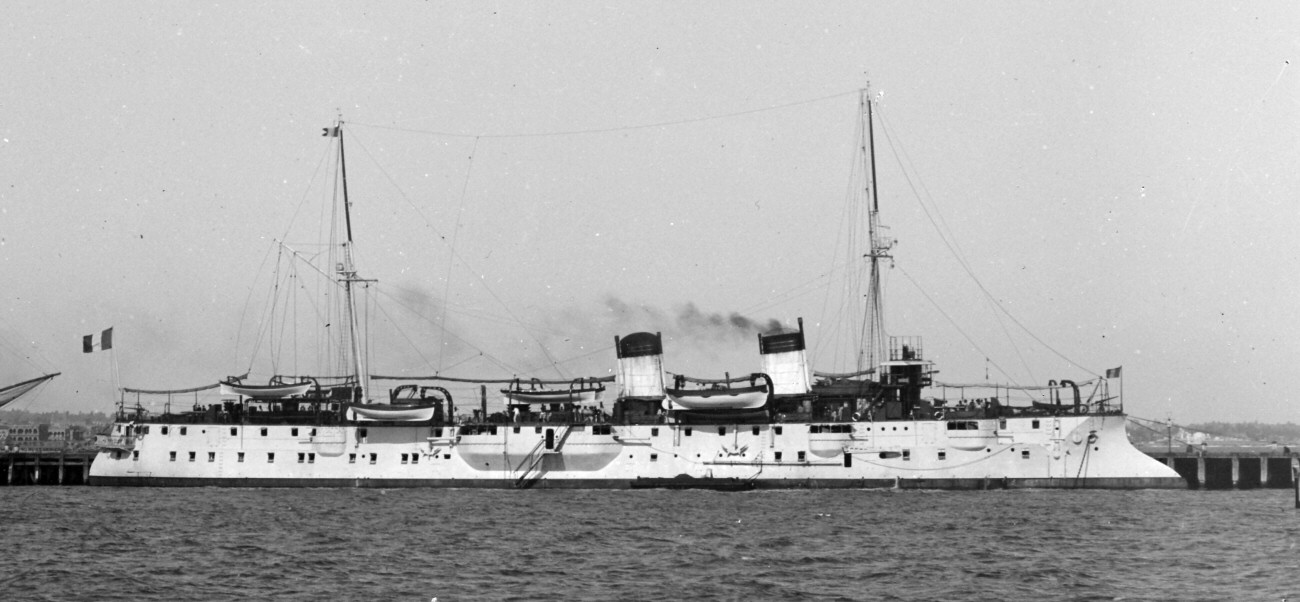
- Protet

Class overview
- Name: Catinat class
- Builders: Société Nouvelle des Forges et Chantiers de la Méditerranée; Forges et Chantiers de la Gironde
- Operators: French Navy
- Preceded by: D'Assas class
- Succeeded by: D'Entrecasteaux
- Built: 1894–1899
- In service: 1898–1911
- Completed: 2
- Retired: 2

General characteristics
- Type: Protected cruiser
- Displacement: 4,113.65 t (4,048.68 long tons; 4,534.52 short tons) (Note: Figures given are for Catinat; Protet differed slightly in dimensions.)
- Length: 101.56 m (333 ft 2 in) loa
- Beam: 13.6 m (44 ft 7 in)
- Draft: 6 m (19 ft 8 in)
- Installed power: 16 × water-tube boilers; 9,500 ihp (7,100 kW)
- Propulsion: 2 × triple-expansion steam engines; 2 × screw propellers
- Speed: 19 knots (35 km/h; 22 mph)
- Range: 6,000 nmi (11,000 km; 6,900 mi) at 10 kn (19 km/h; 12 mph)
- Complement: 399
- Armament: 4 × 164 mm (6.5 in) guns; 10 × 100 mm (3.9 in) guns; 10 × 47 mm (1.9 in) guns; 4 × 37 mm (1.5 in) guns; 2 × 356 mm (14.0 in) torpedo tubes
- Armor: Deck: 25 to 40 mm (0.98 to 1.57 in); Conning tower: 80 mm (3 in)

The Catinat class comprised two protected cruisers of the French Navy built in the early 1890s; the two ships were Catinat and Protet. They were ordered as part of a naval construction program directed at France's rivals, Italy and Germany, particularly after Italy made progress in modernizing its own fleet. The plan was also intended to remedy a deficiency in cruisers that had been revealed during training exercises in the 1880s. As such, the Catinat-class cruisers were intended to operate as fleet scouts and in the French colonial empire. The ships were armed with a main battery of four 164 mm (6.5 in) guns supported by ten 100 mm (3.9 in) guns and they had a top speed of 19.5 to 20 knots (36.1 to 37.0 km/h; 22.4 to 23.0 mph).

Catinat served briefly with the Northern Squadron in 1898 and 1899 before being placed in reserve; thereafter, she and Protet served the entirety of their active careers abroad. Protet was sent to the Pacific in 1899 after being completed, and she remained there through 1905 to protect French interests. Catinat was sent on a brief stint to French Madagascar in 1901 through at least 1902, before returning to France at some point before 1905. Early that year, she was sent to the Pacific to replace her sister ship, remaining there through at least 1908. No records of her activities thereafter survive. That year, Protet was converted into a training ship for the Gunnery School, though she was sold for scrap in 1910. Catinat was discarded the following year.

== Background ==
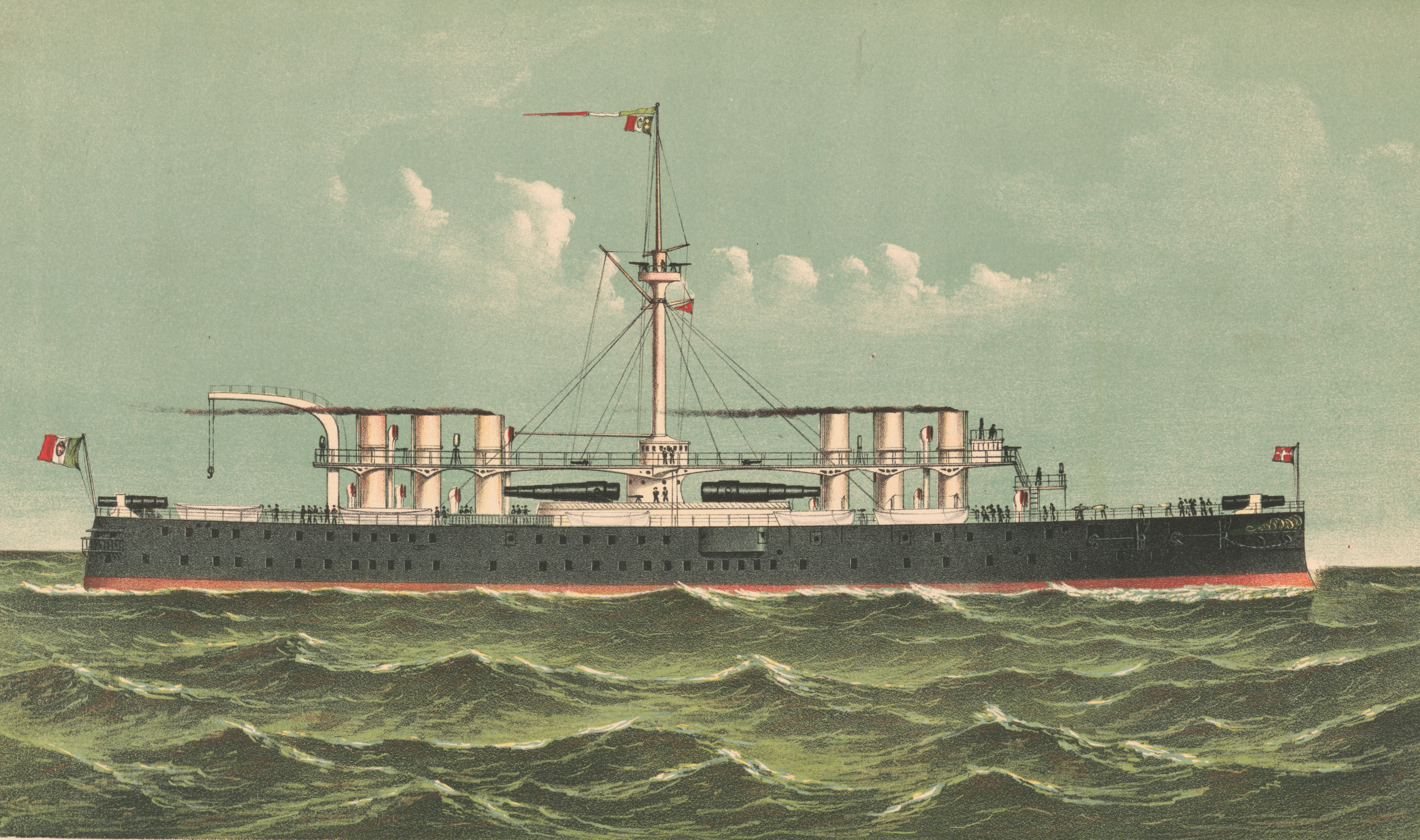
The fast Italian ironclad Italia, the threat of which prompted the French naval program of 1890

In the late 1880s, the Italian Regia Marina (Royal Navy) accelerated construction of ships for its fleet and reorganized its most modern ironclad battleships—the Duilio and Italia classes—into a fast squadron suitable for offensive operations. These developments provoked a strong response in the French press. The Budget Committee in the French Chamber of Deputies began to press for a "two-power standard" in 1888, which would see the French fleet enlarged to equal the combined Italian and German fleets, then France's two main rivals on the continent. This initially came to nothing, as the supporters of the Jeune École doctrine called for a fleet largely based on squadrons of torpedo boats to defend the French coasts rather than an expensive fleet of ironclads. This view had significant support in the Chamber of Deputies.

The next year, a war scare with Italy led to further outcry to strengthen the fleet. To compound matters, the visit of a German squadron of four ironclads to Italy confirmed French concerns of a combined Italo-German fleet that would dramatically outnumber their own. Training exercises held in France that year demonstrated that the slower French fleet would be unable to prevent the faster Italian squadron from bombarding the French coast at will, in part because it lacked enough cruisers (and doctrine to use them) to scout for the enemy ships. To correct the weaknesses of the French fleet, on 22 November 1890, the Superior Council authorized a new construction program directed not at simple parity with the Italian and German fleets, but numerical superiority. In addition to twenty-four new battleships, a total of seventy cruisers were to be built for use in home waters and overseas in the French colonial empire. The Catinat class were ordered to as part of the program, and they were intended to operate in France's overseas colonies.

== Design ==
The earlier cruiser Bugeaud of the Friant class, which provided the basis for the Catinat design

To meet the requirements for new cruisers for overseas deployments, the French naval minister, Édouard Barbey, issued a request on 4 November 1890 for design proposals similar to the older Lapérouse and Villars classes. Barbey laid out his requirements for the Conseil des Travaux (Council of Works), which included a maximum displacement of 2,500 t (2,461 long tons; 2,756 short tons), a speed of at least 16 knots (30 km/h; 18 mph) at natural draft, and a cruising radius of 4,500 nautical miles (8,300 km; 5,200 mi) at 10 knots (19 km/h; 12 mph) with a normal load of coal (and up to 6,000 nmi (11,000 km; 6,900 mi) with a maximum load). Armament was set at four 164.7 mm (6.48 in) guns and ten 100 mm (3.9 in) guns, and the ship was to be protected by deck consisting of a pair of 10 mm (0.39 in) layers. The new ships were to incorporate a barque sailing rig for extended voyages overseas. The Conseil made several alterations, including increasing the speed and cruising radius, which necessitated a displacement of around 2,900 t (2,900 long tons; 3,200 short tons). Barbey approved their recommendations and requested proposals from several shipyards on 3 February 1891.

Five yards submitted proposals, and on 31 July the Conseil examined the submissions. The Conseil selected a design from the shipyard Ateliers et Chantiers de la Loire, which became the Descartes class, but they also chose a submission from the naval engineer Joseph Louis Tissier for further development as well. Tissier had noted that the specifications issued by Barbey were broadly similar to the earlier Friant-class cruisers, so he based his design on those vessels. He widened the hull slightly and added a layer of wood to the copper sheathing to protect the vessel during lengthy deployments overseas, where shipyard facilities were not readily available. (Note: AC de la Loire had based its design on the cruiser Davout, which had also provided the basis for the Friant design Tissier used for his submission, so the Catinat and Descartes-class cruisers were very similar vessels.) The Conseil requested that Tissier replace the Lagrafel et d'Allest water-tube boilers with Belleville boilers, which would improve the arrangement of the boiler rooms.

In his revised design, which he had completed by January 1893, Tissier altered the arrangement of the main battery to more closely resemble the AC de la Loire design; he had originally placed the guns in sponsons that were widely spaced, but the Conseil preferred the closer arrangement that AC de la Loire had adopted. On 24 January, Barbey forwarded the design to the Conseil, which approved it on 7 March. Final approval from the naval command was given on 21 July; the first ship, Catinat, was to be allocated to the 1893 budget, but delays forced her contract to be moved to the 1894 budget.

=== General characteristics and machinery ===
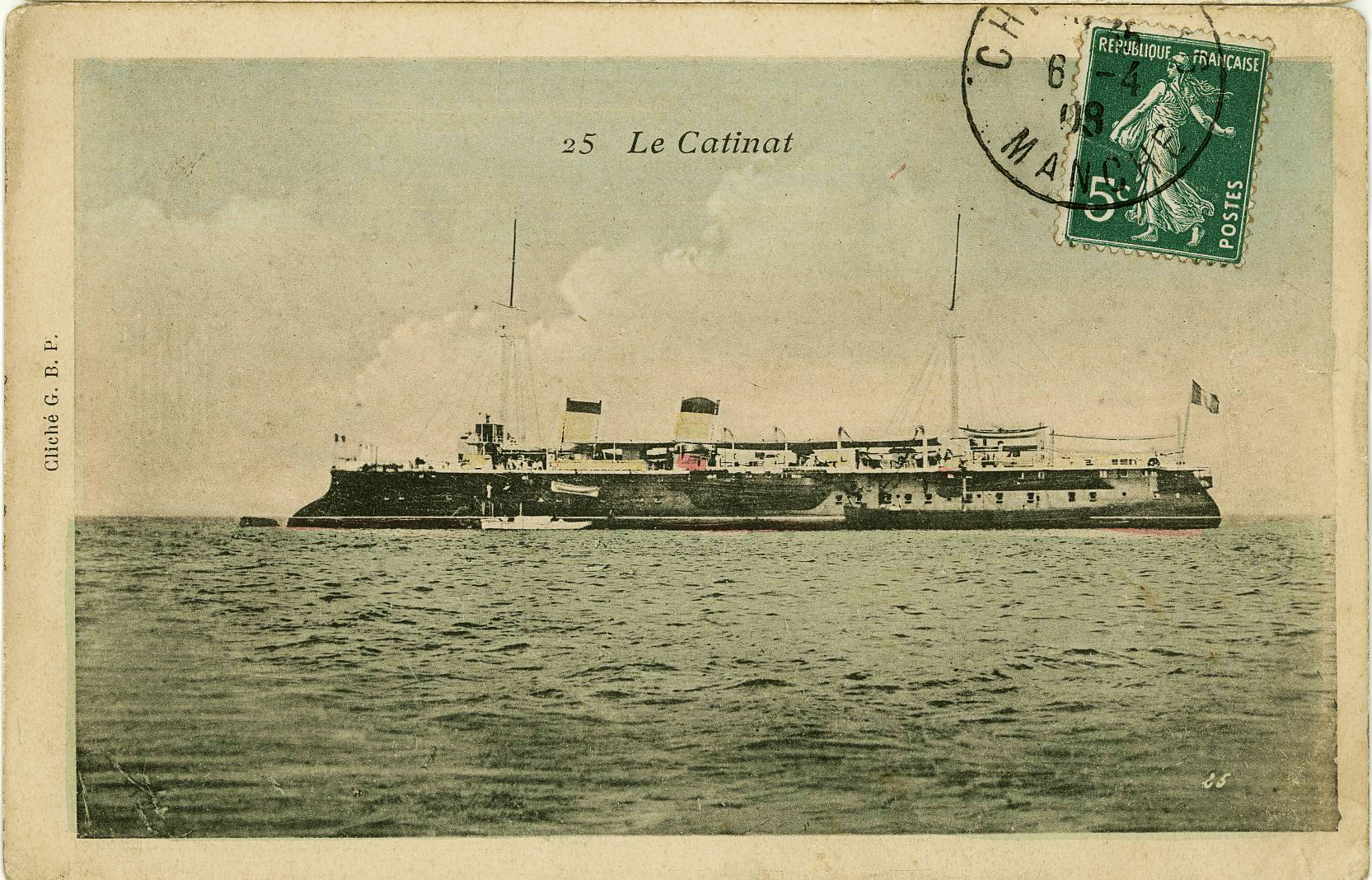
Postcard depicting Catinat

The ships of the Catinat class differed slightly in dimensions. Both were 101.2 m (332 ft) long at the waterline, but Catinat was 101.56 m (333 ft 2 in) long overall while Protet was 101.52 m (333 ft 1 in) overall. They had a beam of 13.6 m (44 ft 7 in), which increased to 15.23 and 15.52 m (50 ft 0 in and 50 ft 11 in) at the sponsons for Catinat and Protet, respectively. Catinat had an average draft of 6 m (19 ft 8 in), while Protet's draft was 6.07 m (19 ft 11 in). Catinat displaced 4,113.65 t (4,048.68 long tons; 4,534.52 short tons), while Protet displaced 4,183.55 t (4,117.48 long tons; 4,611.57 short tons). Protet suffered from stability problems and had to have ballast added, accounting for her greater displacement. Catinat was instead affected by severe vibration at speeds greater than 15 knots (28 km/h; 17 mph); both ships were poorly ventilated.

Like most French warships of the period, the Catinat-class cruisers' hulls had a pronounced ram bow, tumblehome shape, and a short forecastle deck. Below the waterline, the hulls were covered in a layer of wood and copper sheathing to protect them from biofouling on long voyages overseas. The ships had a minimal superstructure, consisting primarily of a small conning tower and a bridge. They were originally to have been fitted with heavy military masts, but during construction, these were replaced with lighter pole masts with spotting tops for observation and signaling purposes. The ships were fitted with four searchlights. Their crew numbered 399 officers and enlisted men.

The ships' propulsion system consisted of a pair of vertical triple-expansion steam engines driving two screw propellers. Steam was provided by sixteen coal-burning Belleville-type water-tube boilers that were ducted into two funnels. Their machinery was rated to produce 7,000 indicated horsepower (5,200 kW) normally, and up to 9,000 ihp (6,700 kW) using forced draft, for a top speed of 19 knots (35 km/h; 22 mph). In their initial sea trials, Catinat was reached 9,933 ihp (7,407 kW) for a speed of 19.61 knots (36.32 km/h; 22.57 mph) and Catinat made 9,425 ihp (7,028 kW) for 20.28 knots (37.56 km/h; 23.34 mph). Coal storage amounted to 570.18 t (561.17 long tons; 628.52 short tons), which allowed them to steam for 6,000 nautical miles (11,000 km; 6,900 mi) at a speed of 10 knots (19 km/h; 12 mph).

=== Armament and armor ===
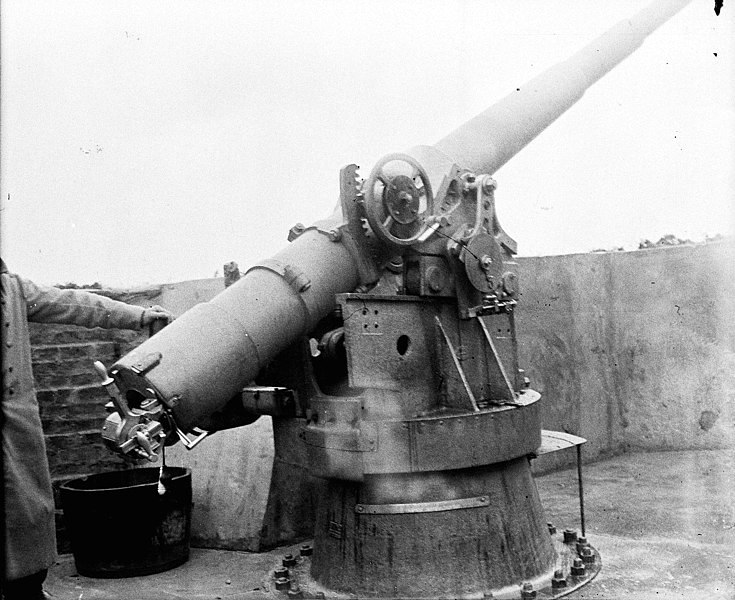
A 100 mm (3.9 in) Model 1891 gun in a pivot mount

The Catinat-class vessels were armed with a main battery of four 164 mm (6.5 in) Modèle 1893 45-caliber guns. They were placed in pairs in a single large sponson amidships, two guns per broadside. They were supplied with a variety of shells, including solid, 45 kg (99 lb) cast iron projectiles, and explosive armor-piercing (AP) and semi-armor-piercing (SAP) shells that weighed 54.2 kg (119 lb) and 52.6 kg (116 lb), respectively. The guns fired with a muzzle velocity of 770 to 800 m/s (2,500 to 2,600 ft/s).

The main battery was supported by a secondary battery of ten 100 mm (3.9 in) 45-cal. Modèle 1891 guns (Protet carried the newer M1893 variant), which were carried in a variety of mounts. Two guns fitted with gun shields were placed side-by-side in pivot mounts on the upper deck, four more were in the upper deck forward in casemates. Another pair of guns were in sponsons further aft, and the remaining pair were in pivot mounts on the upper deck aft. The guns fired 14 kg (31 lb) cast iron and 16 kg (35 lb) AP shells with a muzzle velocity of 710 to 740 m/s (2,300 to 2,400 ft/s).

For close-range defense against torpedo boats, they carried ten 47 mm (1.9 in) 40-cal. M1885 Hotchkiss guns and four 37 mm (1.5 in) 20-cal. M1885 guns, all in individual pivot mounts. They were also armed with two 356 mm (14 in) torpedo tubes in their hulls above the waterline, one per broadside. In addition, they carried a pair of 65 mm (2.6 in) 16-cal. M1881 field guns that could be sent ashore with a landing party. They had a capacity to carry fifty naval mines, which were stored in the compartment for the steering engine. A rail extended aft, through the captain's cabin, to a port in the stern, where the mines could be dropped into the ships' wake.

Armor protection consisted of a curved armor deck that was 25 mm (0.98 in) thick on the flat portion, curving down at the sides, where it increased in thickness to 40 mm (1.6 in), decreasing back down to 25 mm at the lower edge. The deck consisted of mild steel, and was layered on 20 mm (0.79 in) of normal deck plating. Above the deck, a cellular layer of watertight compartments was intended to contain flooding below the waterline. A light splinter deck that was 7 mm (0.28 in) thick covered the propulsion machinery spaces to protect them from shell fragments that penetrated the main armor deck. The gun shields for the deck-mounted 100 mm guns were 54 mm (2 in) thick. Catinat had 80 mm (3.1 in) steel plating on the conning tower, while Protet received 72 mm (2.8 in).

== Construction ==
Construction data
Name	Budget designation	Laid down	Launched	Commissioned	Shipyard
Catinat	E3	February 1894	8 October 1896	12 May 1897	Société Nouvelle des Forges et Chantiers de la Méditerranée, Graville
Protet	E4	5 November 1895	6 July 1898	6 August 1898	Forges et Chantiers de la Gironde, Lormont
Jurien de la Gravière	E5	Allocated to 1894 budget, but cancelled before construction			
Unnamed	E6	Allocated to 1894 budget, but cancelled before construction			

== Service history ==
Catinat, date unknown

Catinat was assigned to the Northern Squadron in 1898, where she conducted training exercises with the rest of the unit. During maneuvers that year, she accidentally ran aground, but was not seriously damaged in the incident. She served in the unit for less than a year before being transferred to the reserve fleet. Protet was sent to the Pacific Ocean for a lengthy deployment after her completion in 1899. She helped suppress a fire in the United States in 1900 and protected French interests in Colombia during a conflict in the country in 1901. Catinat had been recommissioned and sent abroad by 1901, being stationed in French Madagascar. She operated there at least through 1902.

At some point thereafter, Catinat was recalled home and decommissioned once more. From 1903 to 1905, she lay at Lorient, where she was "completely abandoned". In early 1905, she was recommissioned to relieve Protet, which had also been recalled home that year. After arriving in France, it was determined that Protet's boilers were in poor condition, but repairs were deemed to be too expensive. She was converted into a training ship for gun crews at the Gunnery School in 1908, but served in that capacity for just two years. She was struck from the naval register in 1910 and thereafter broken up. Catinat's career in the Pacific was uneventful, and she remained on station in the region through 1908. She was placed in reserve in July 1909, struck in 1910, and followed her sister ship to the breakers' yard in 1911.
