= French cruiser Protet =

Protected cruiser of the French Navy

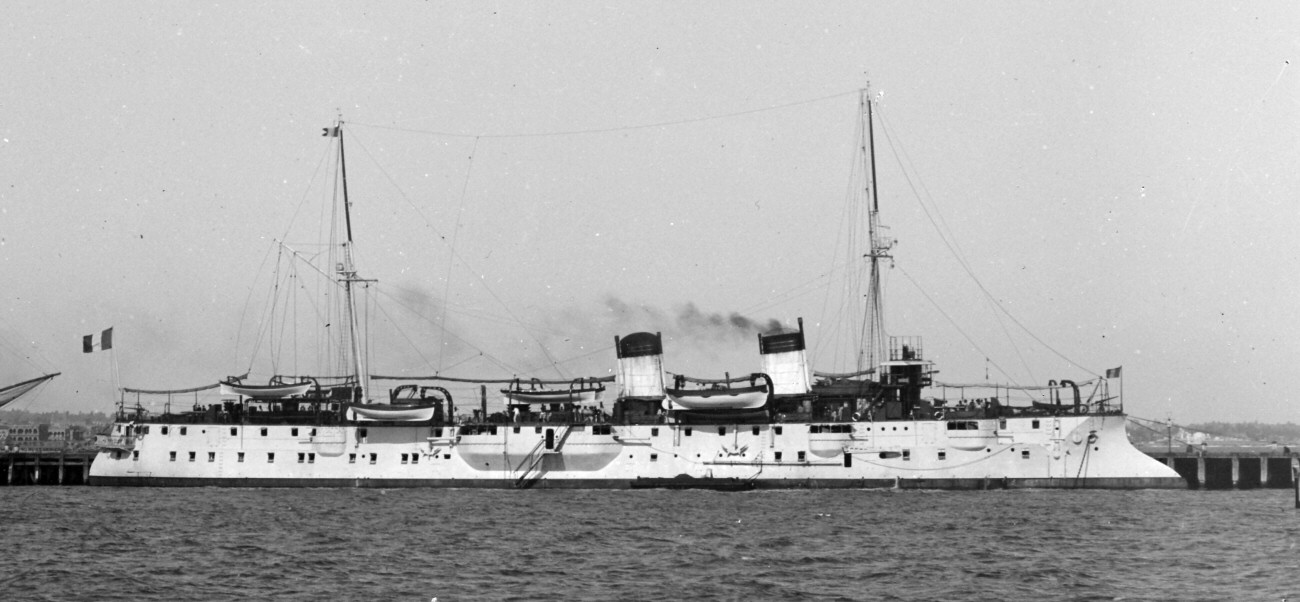
- Protet

History

France
- Name: Protet
- Ordered: 14 August 1895
- Builder: Forges et Chantiers de la Gironde
- Laid down: 5 November 1895
- Launched: 6 July 1898
- Commissioned: 6 August 1898
- Decommissioned: 1 March 1909
- Stricken: 9 March 1910
- Fate: Broken up, 1910

General characteristics
- Class & type: Catinat-class cruiser
- Displacement: 4,183.55 t (4,117.48 long tons; 4,611.57 short tons)
- Length: 101.52 m (333 ft 1 in) loa
- Beam: 13.6 m (44 ft 7 in)
- Draft: 6.07 m (19 ft 11 in)
- Installed power: 16 × water-tube boilers; 9,500 ihp (7,100 kW)
- Propulsion: 2 × triple-expansion steam engines; 2 × screw propellers
- Speed: 19 knots (35 km/h; 22 mph)
- Range: 6,000 nmi (11,000 km; 6,900 mi) at 10 kn (19 km/h; 12 mph)
- Complement: 399
- Armament: 4 × 164 mm (6.5 in) guns; 10 × 100 mm (3.9 in) guns; 10 × 47 mm (1.9 in) guns; 4 × 37 mm (1.5 in) guns; 2 × 356 mm (14.0 in) torpedo tubes
- Armor: Deck: 25 to 40 mm (0.98 to 1.57 in); Conning tower: 72 mm (3 in)

Protet was a protected cruiser of the French Navy built in the 1890s, the second and final member of the Catinat class. The Catinat-class cruisers were ordered as part of a construction program directed at strengthening the fleet's cruiser force at a time when the country was concerned with the growing naval threat of the Italian and German fleets. The new cruisers were intended to serve with the main fleet and overseas in the French colonial empire. Protet was armed with a main battery of four 164 mm (6.5 in) guns, was protected by an armor deck that was 25 to 60 mm (0.98 to 2.36 in) thick, and was capable of steaming at a top speed of up to 20 knots (37 km/h; 23 mph).

After entering service in 1899, Protet was sent to the Pacific Ocean for a lengthy deployment; she was to spend the majority of her active career in the region. While there, she helped suppress a fire in the United States in 1900 and protected French interests in Colombia during a conflict in the country in 1901. The ship was eventually recalled to France in 1905. She was later assigned to the Gunnery School as a training ship in 1908 before being struck from the naval register in 1910 and thereafter broken up.

== Design ==
In response to a war scare with Italy in the late 1880s, the French Navy embarked on a major construction program in 1890 to counter the threat of the Italian fleet and that of Italy's ally Germany. The plan called for a total of seventy cruisers for use in home waters and overseas in the French colonial empire. The Catinat class was ordered as part of the program, and they were based on the earlier Friant class. Protet and Catinat were poorly ventilated for vessels that were intended on lengthy voyages in the overseas empire.

Protet was 101.52 m (333 ft 1 in) long overall, with a beam of 13.6 m (44 ft 7 in) and a draft of 6.07 m (19 ft 11 in). She displaced 4,183.55 t (4,117.48 long tons; 4,611.57 short tons). Her crew numbered 399 officers and enlisted men. The ship's propulsion system consisted of a pair of triple-expansion steam engines driving two screw propellers. Steam was provided by sixteen coal-burning Belleville-type water-tube boilers that were ducted into two funnels. Her machinery was rated to produce 9,500 indicated horsepower (7,100 kW) for a top speed of 19.5 to 20 knots (36.1 to 37.0 km/h; 22.4 to 23.0 mph), though she exceeded this speed on sea trials. She had a cruising range of 6,000 nautical miles (11,000 km; 6,900 mi) at a speed of 10 knots (19 km/h; 12 mph); at maximum speed, this fell to 1,000 nmi (1,900 km; 1,200 mi).

The ship was armed with a main battery of four 164 mm (6.5 in) guns. They were placed in individual sponsons clustered amidships, two guns per broadside. These were supported by a secondary battery of ten 100 mm (3.9 in) guns, which were carried in sponsons, casemates, and pivot mounts. For close-range defense against torpedo boats, she carried ten 47 mm (1.9 in) 3-pounder Hotchkiss guns and four 37 mm (1.5 in) 1-pounder guns. She was also armed with two 356 mm (14 in) torpedo tubes in her hull above the waterline. Armor protection consisted of a curved armor deck that was 25 to 40 mm (0.98 to 1.57 in) thick, along with 72 mm (2.8 in) plating on the conning tower.

== Service history ==
Protet sometime before 1905

Protet was built at the Forges et Chantiers de la Gironde shipyard in Lormont; she was ordered on 14 August 1895 and her keel was laid down on 5 November. While the ship was still on the slipway, her propulsion machinery was installed; most fitting out was completed while she was still on the stocks unlike the normal practice. The ship was launched on 6 July 1898 and only minimal work had to be carried out before she was commissioned to begin sea trials. She was moved to Rochefort on 3 August and was commissioned there three days later. During her trials, she reached a speed of 20.22 knots (37.45 km/h; 23.27 mph) from 9,300 ihp (6,900 kW) using forced draft. She was placed in full commission on 20 April to be sent to the Far East; according to the contemporary Journal of the Royal United Service Institution, she was being sent to replace the old unprotected cruiser Duguay-Trouin, but the modern historian Stephen Roberts indicates she was sent to relieve the old ironclad Duguesclin. Protet got underway on 27 May, bound for the Pacific.

The following year, she was joined there by the protected cruiser Infernet and the transport vessel Aube. Protet was in San Francisco in the United States in 1900 when a fire broke out in the harbor; Protet sent men ashore to help suppress the blaze, prompting the city's mayor to send a note of thanks to the French government. While she was in that city in April and May, she received four electric ventilators to improve the habitability of the ship during its long voyages in the tropics. Protet was still serving in the Naval Division of the Eastern Pacific by January 1901, which also included the gunboat Zélée and four transport vessels. In October that year, she went to Panama City, then still part of Colombia, to protect French interests during the Thousand Days' War; she met vessels from other navies, including the United States pre-dreadnought battleship USS Iowa and the British sloop HMS Icarus. On the Caribbean side of the isthmus of Panama, at Colón, the French cruiser Suchet and the United States gunboat USS Machias also awaited developments in the conflict. In December, Protet steamed north to the United States' Mare Island Naval Shipyard in California to replenish coal and supplies.

The ship remained on the Pacific station in 1902. In January, she returned to Panama City, where she met the British cruiser HMS Amphion and the United States cruiser USS Philadelphia. Protet and Amphion remained there through June. By 1903, the station had been reduced to Protet and a gunboat. Protet remained on station in the Pacific in 1904, along with the gunboat Zélée and one transport aviso. Protet continued to operate in the Pacific in 1905, and in January, she stopped in San Francisco to take on coal. Later that year, Protet was recalled to France, and by late May, she had reached Dakar in French West Africa, where she was relieved by her sister ship Catinat. Protet arrived back in Rochefort on 7 June and was placed in special reserve ten days later. By that time, the ship's boilers were badly worn out. The naval command decided that the cost of repairs was too high, given her weakness compared to foreign contemporaries, and she was accordingly left idle until 1 March 1909, when she was decommissioned at Rochefort. During that period, in 1908, Protet was attached to the Gunnery Training School, along with the armored cruiser Latouche-Tréville. Protet was struck from the naval register on 3 August 1910 and she was thereafter sold to ship breakers on 25 October. She was taken under tow on 12 November, to be taken to the breakers' yard in Hamburg, Germany, but severe storms forced Protet and her tug to seek shelter off Île-d'Aix until early December, at which point they were able to proceed to Hamburg.
